= Historical Latvian Lands =

Regions of Latvia

Map of the Historical Latvian Lands with cities and towns (since 2021)

Historical Latvian Lands (Latvian: Latviešu vēsturiskās zemes) or formerly Cultural regions of Latvia (Latvian: Latvijas kultūrvēsturiskie novadi) are several areas within Latvia formally recognised as distinct from the rest of the country. These are: Kurzeme (Courland), Zemgale (Semigallia), Latgale (Latgalia), Vidzeme, and Sēlija (Selonia). While some of these regions are seen purely as culturally distinct, others have historically been parts of different countries and have been used to divide the country for administrative and other purposes.

On 16 June 2021, the Saeima adopted the Historical Latvian Lands Law which aims to create the necessary preconditions for strengthening the common identity of the population and for the preservation and sustainable development of the cultural and historical environment and cultural spaces of the historical Latvian lands. The Law assigns each parish and town in Latvia to one of the five historical Latvian regions: Vidzeme, Latgale, Kurzeme, Zemgale, and Sēlija. The state city of Riga, a Baltic metropolis, is a historical part of Vidzeme and the special identity and the particularities of the cultural and historical environment of Riga should be supported and promoted.

== Historical Latvian Lands ==
The Latvian nation was formed from the cultures of peoples that inhabited the Historical Latvian Lands: Livonians, Curonians, Latgalians (ancient and modern), Selonians, and Semigalians, under the influence of the Baltic German culture.

The Appendix 1 to the Historical Latvian Lands Law enumerates the cities (or city parts) and parishes according to the historical lands.

- Courland (Latvian: Kurzeme, Livonian: Kurāmō), the westernmost part of Latvia, consisting of the cities of Liepāja and Ventspils and the municipalities of Kuldīga, Saldus, South Kurzeme, Talsi and Ventspils. Traditional Courland also includes environs of Klaipėda County and Telšiai County in the northwestern part of Lithuania.
- Semigallia (Latvian: Zemgale) is the central part of Latvia. Zemgale is bounded by Kurzeme in the west, the Gulf of Riga, the Daugava river and Vidzeme in the north, Selonia in the east and the Lithuanian border in the south. It consists of the city of Jelgava and the municipalities of Ķekava, Bauska, Dobele, Jelgava and Tukums. Traditional Semigallia also includes the northern part of Šiauliai County in Lithuania.
- Selonia (Latvian: Sēlija, Augšzeme) is often considered a part of Semigallia. Selonia comprises the eastern part of the 1939 province of Semigallia, roughly corresponding to parts of the former Aizkraukle, Daugavpils and Jēkabpils districts south of Daugava river. Traditional Selonia also includes a portion of north east Lithuania. Named after the Selonians.
- Vidzeme (Livonian: Vidūmō), meaning "Middle land", is also known as Livonia or Livland, though it comprises only the Latvian part of Swedish Livonia and the city of Riga. It roughly corresponds to the former Alūksne, Cēsis, Gulbene, Limbaži, Madona, Valka, Valmiera districts and parts of Aizkraukle, Ogre and Riga districts north of Daugava river.
- Latgallia (Latvian: Latgale, Latgalian: Latgola), the part of Livonia still in the hands of the Polish–Lithuanian Commonwealth after the Treaty of Altmark in 1629, then called Polish Livonia or Inflanty Voivodeship. It roughly corresponds to Balvi, Krāslava, Ludza, Preiļi, Rēzekne districts and parts of Daugavpils and Jēkabpils districts north of Daugava river. The Latgalian language, a dialect of Latvian, is based on this territory.

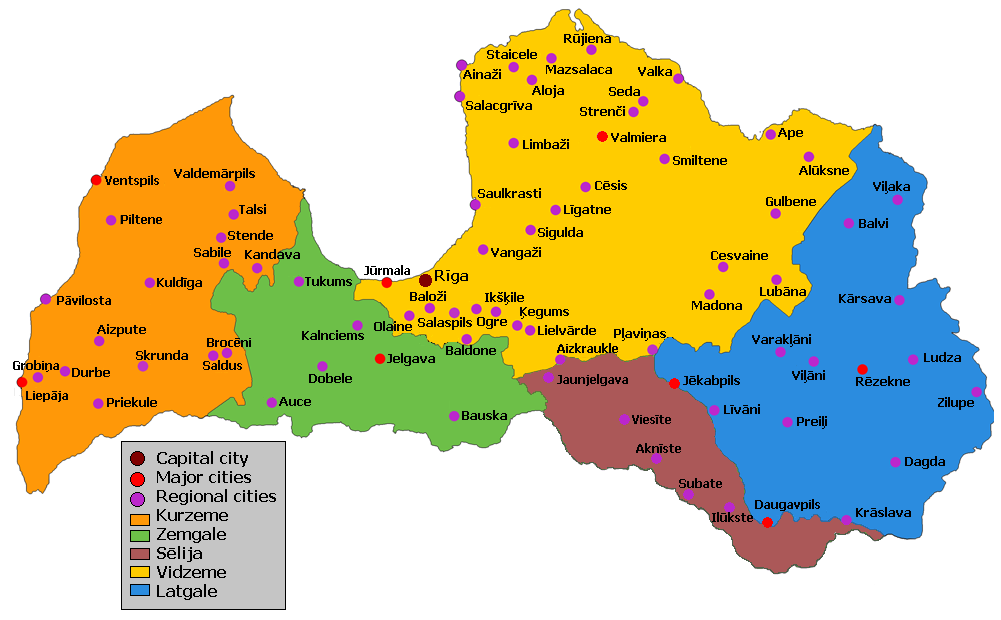
Five Historical Latvian Lands with cities and towns (before 2021)

In some cases, Kurzeme, Sēlija and Zemgale are combined into one region. This reflects the political division of Latvia between 1629 and 1917, when Kurzeme and Zemgale were together, first as the Duchy of Courland and Semigallia, then as the Courland Governorate in the Russian Empire while Vidzeme and Latgale as parts of the Duchy of Livonia were politically separate, both from Courland and one from another since the 17 century. From this perspective, there are three regions: Kurzeme (including Zemgale and Sēlija), Vidzeme and Latgale. Such division is no longer commonly used but it can be seen in the coat of arms of Latvia and the Monument of Freedom in Riga both of which contain three stars: for Kurzeme, Vidzeme and Latgale, which were united into Latvia in 1918.

== Regional symbols ==
Coat of arms of Courland

Coat of arms of Semigallia

Coat of arms of Selonia

Coat of arms of Vidzeme

Coat of arms of Latgallia

Historical flag of Courland. No contemporary flag exists

Flag of Latgallia

Flag of Selonia

Flag of Semigallia

== Other ethnocultural regions ==
Map of Latvian dialects

Several other, smaller, ethnocultural regions are identified in Latvia: Maliena, Piebalga, Lejaskurzeme, Suiti parishes, Livonian Coast (Lībiešu krasts), Leišmale, and Vidiena.

== See also ==
- Administrative divisions of Latvia
- Planning regions of Latvia
- Statistical regions of Latvia
