= Coat of arms of Latvia =

- Greater version

Versions
- Middle version

- Lesser version
- Armiger: Republic of Latvia
- Adopted: June 15, 1921
- Crest: An arc of three mullets Or
- Shield: Per fess and in base per pale: 1st Azure, a demi-sun issuing from base Or; 2nd Argent, a lion rampant contourné Gules; 3rd Gules, a gryphon segreant brandishing in the dexter claw a sword Argent.
- Supporters: Dexter, a lion rampant Gules, and sinister, a griffin segreant Argent; both langued Or
- Compartment: Two oak branches fructed Vert tied together by a ribbon Sanguine charged with a bar Argent

The Coat of arms of the Republic of Latvia was officially adopted by the Constitutional Assembly of Latvia on 15 June 1921, and entered official use starting on 19 August 1921. It was created using new national symbols, as well as elements of the coats of arms of Polish-Lithuanian and Swedish Livonia and of the Duchy of Courland and Semigallia. Thus, the coat of arms combines symbols of Latvian national statehood, as well as symbols of its historical regions. The Latvian national coat of arms was designed by Latvian artists Vilhelms Krūmiņš and Rihards Zariņš.

Previously, after the proclamation of the independence of Latvia, an emblem was adopted by the People's Council of Latvia on 6 December 1918 as a 'national coat of arms'. The symbol, designed by Burkards Dzenis, consisted of a Sun (a symbol of self-determination, used in badges of the Latvian Riflemen) with 17 rays, symbolizing the counties inhabited by Latvians. The bottom of the disk was covered by a ribbon in the colors of the Latvian flag. At the center of the solar disk a letter "L" and three stars were placed. This emblem was mostly used in slightly different monochrome variations as an official seal (by the People's Council, the Constitutional Assembly and other government and military institutions, on the banknotes of the Latvian ruble, diplomatic passports etc.).

== Elements ==
The three golden stars above the shield represent the three historical regions of Latvia: Vidzeme (Swedish Livonia), Latgale (Latgalia or Polish Livonia) and Kurzeme (Courland, also Zemgale or Semigallia as the Duchy of Courland and Semigalia) and their unity.

The golden sun in a blue field represents freedom. The sun was also used as a symbol of distinction and national identity used by the Imperial Russian Army's Latvian Riflemen units during World War I. During the war, the sun was fashioned with 17 rays that symbolised the 17 Latvian-inhabited districts.

The bottom part of escutcheon is divided into two fields:

- The red lion from the Coat of arms of Courland represents Courland and Semigallia. The symbol appears as early as 1565 in the coat of arms of the former Duke of Courland and Semigalia.
- The silver griffin from the Coat of arms of Livonia represents Vidzeme and Latgalia. The Gryf coat of arms as the heraldic symbol of the Duchy of Livonia was granted in 1566, when the territories known today as Vidzeme and Latgale had come under the control of the Grand Duchy of Lithuania.

The red lion and silver griffin are also used as supporters.

Base of the coat of arms is decorated with the branches of an oak tree, Quercus robur, which is one of Latvia's national symbols, and tied by a red-white-red ribbon.

There is also a version with a mantle, which is on display at the Plenary Chamber in the House of the Livonian Noble Corporation.

Coat of arms of Courland

Coat of arms of Livonia

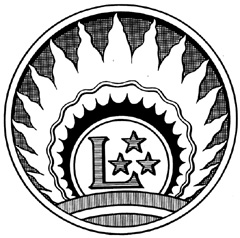
Emblem adopted on 6 December 1918 as a "national coat of arms" and used until 1921. This variation was used on the first banknotes of the Latvian ruble in 1919.

Emblem of the Latvian National Armed Forces including the sun with 17 rays and three stars

An illustrative "coat of arms" at the hall of the Constitutional Assembly of Latvia

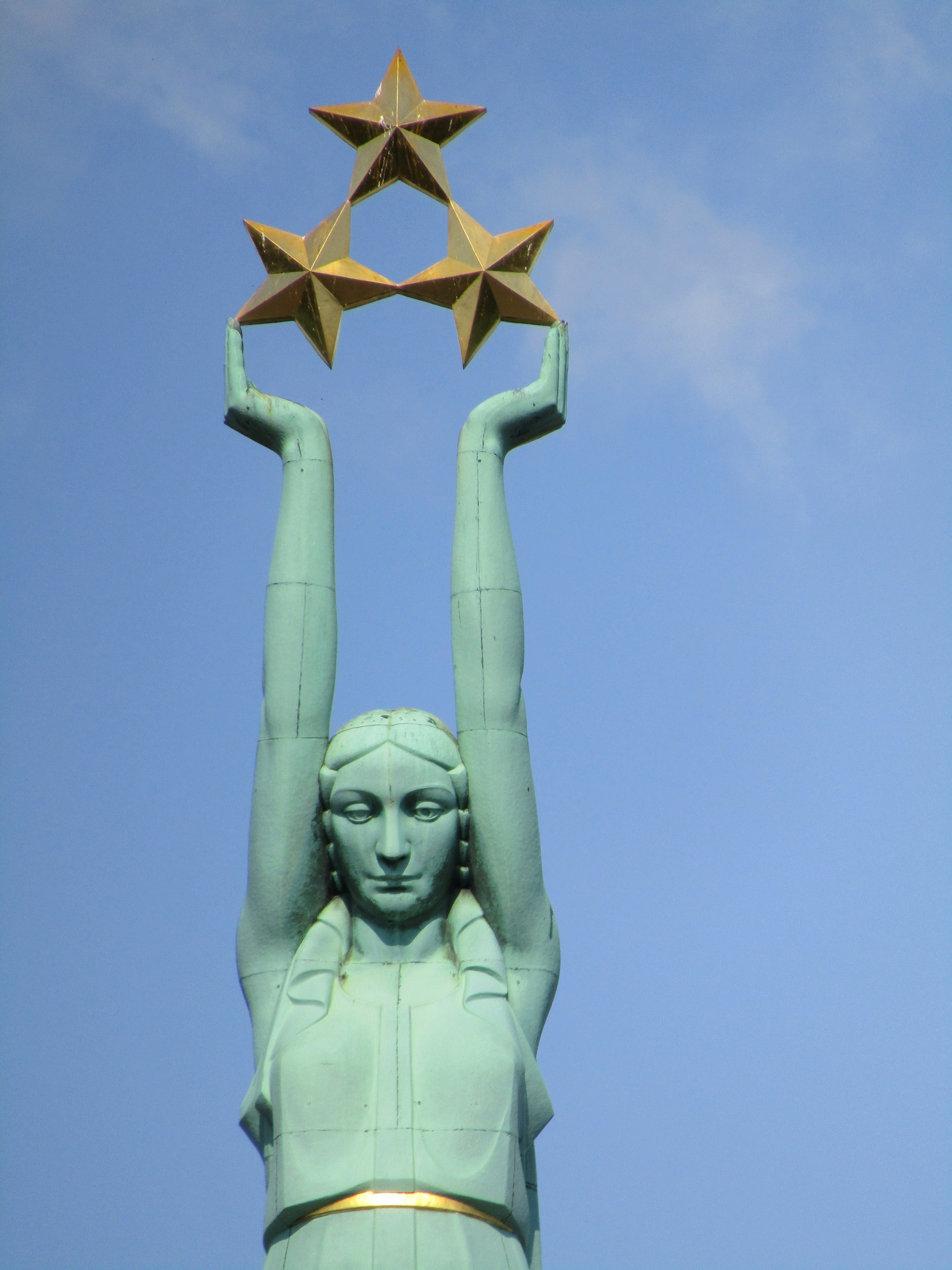
Three stars on the Freedom Monument in Riga

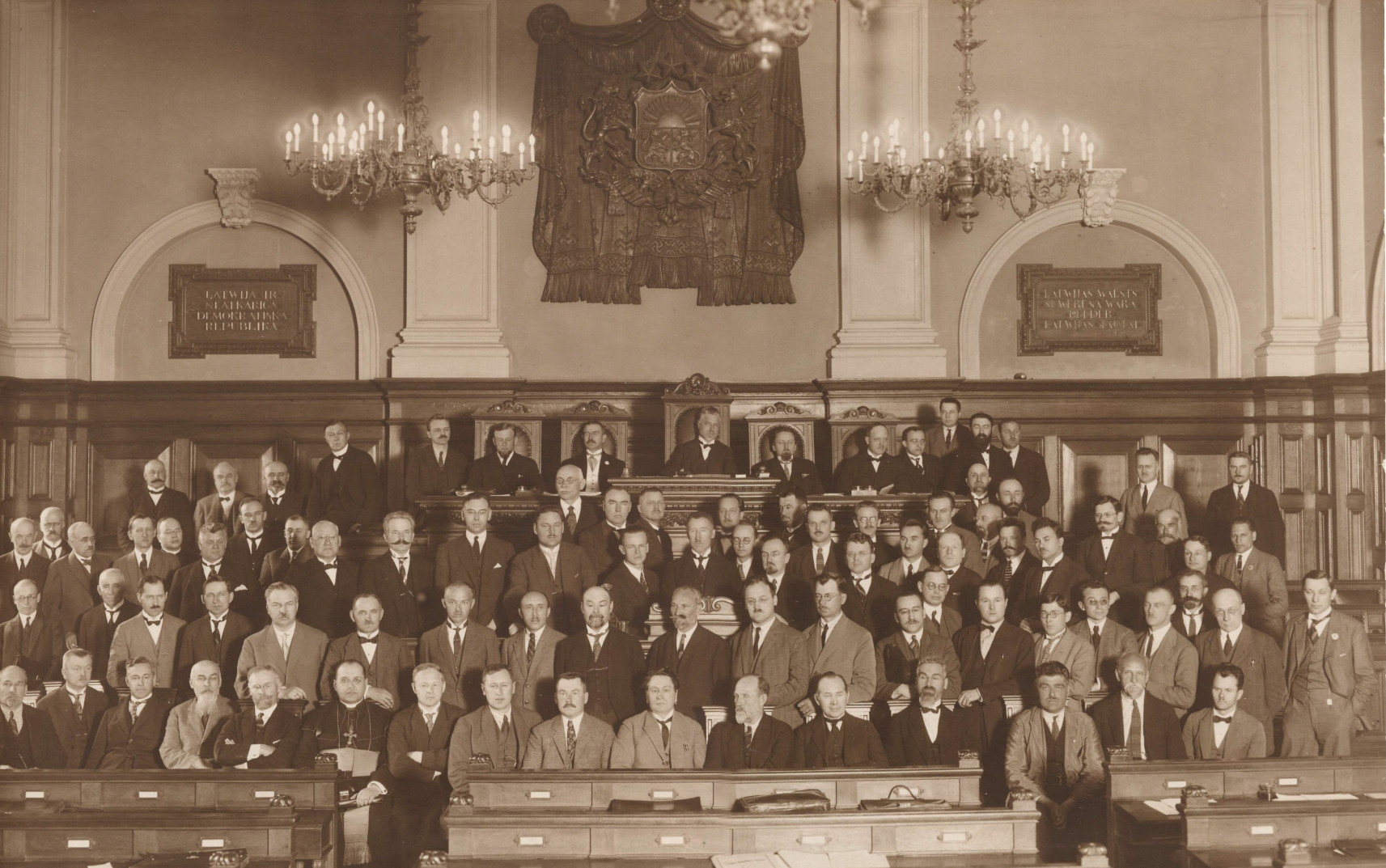
Greater national coat of arms of Latvia with a mantle during the first session of the 1st Saeima of the Republic of Latvia in 1922

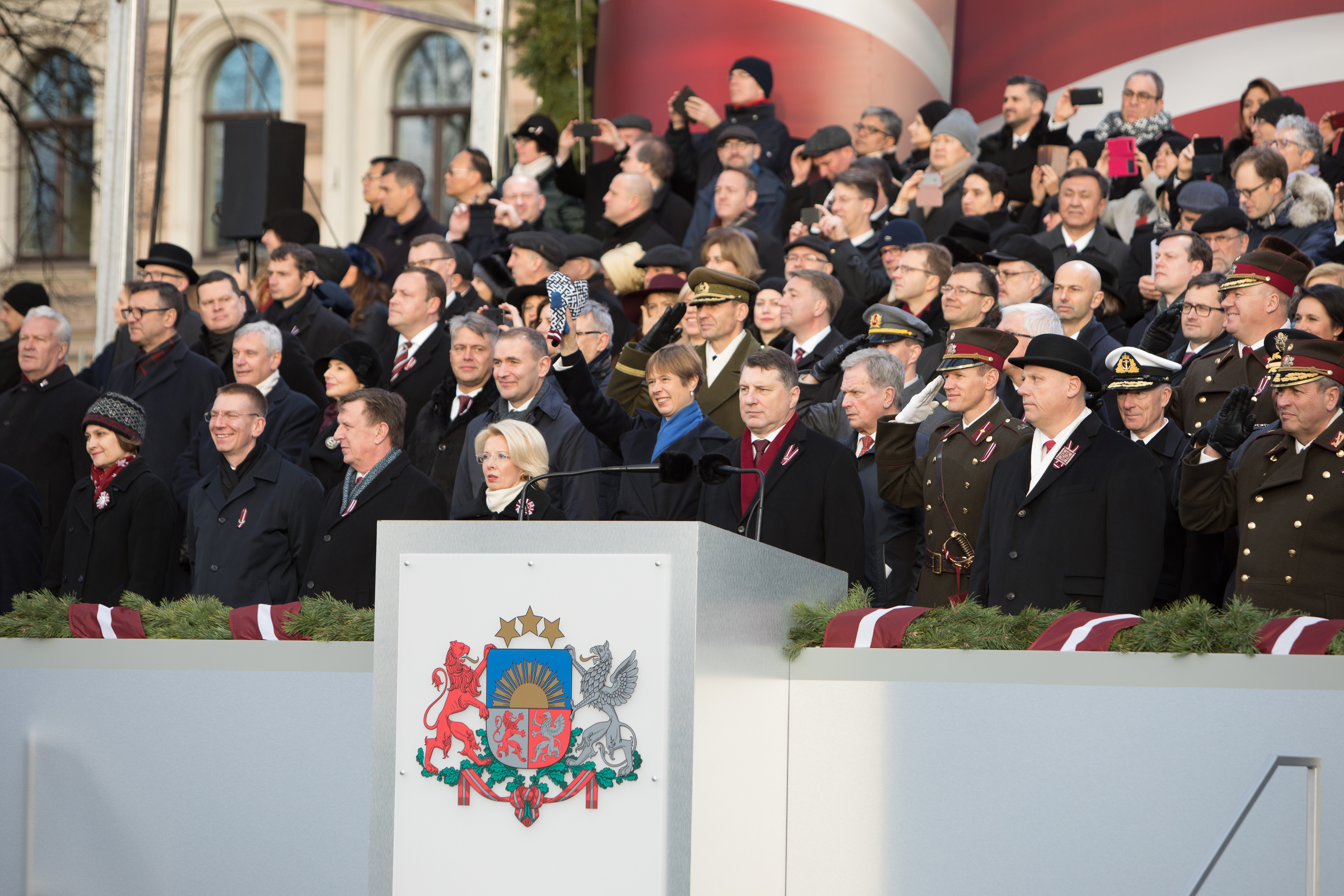
The tribune decorated with tree branches tied by red-white-red ribbon during the Proclamation Day parade in 2018

== Usage ==
The proper use of the Latvian coat of arms is firmly regulated. Three types of symbols are used: the large coat of arms, the small enhanced coat of arms and the small coat of arms.

- The Greater Coat of Arms is used by the President of Latvia, the Parliament, the Prime Minister, the Cabinet of Ministers, government ministries, the Supreme Court and Prosecutor General, as well as Latvian diplomatic and consular missions.
- The Small Enhanced Coat of Arms, (the Middle version) is used by Parliament agencies, the Cabinet of Ministers and other institutions under direct or indirect supervision of government ministries.
- The Small Coat of Arms is used by other government institutions, municipal authorities and educational institutions on official documents.

After the Soviet occupation of Latvia in 1940, the coat of arms was used until 5 August 1940. During the existence of the Latvian Soviet Socialist Republic, the emblem of the Latvian Soviet Socialist Republic was used. The Latvian coat of arms was restored once again on 15 February 1990.

Until 1 January 2014 both versions of the Latvian lats used the small coat of arms on the obverse sides of 1s, 2s, 5s, 10s, 20s and 50s coins, the large coat of arms was used on the obverse sides of Ls 1 and Ls 2 coins and the reverse sides of all banknotes. After the introduction of Euro, the small coat of arms is used on the national sides of €0.01, €0.02 and €0.05 coins, the large coat of arms is used on the national sides of €0.10, €0.20 and €0.50 coins.

On 1 January 2015, the Cabinet of Ministers introduced the uniform visual identity for governmental institutions, which uses the coat of arms in the middle, and topped with a bar of the respective color of the institution.

== Colours ==
The colours used in the coat of arms are defined according to the official regulation as follows:

	Black	Blue	Golden	Green	Red	Silver
Pantone	Black C	286 C	873 C / 131 C	341 C	186 C	877 C / Cool Gray 4 C
CMYK	0, 0, 0, 100	100, 66, 0, 2	0, 32, 100, 9	100, 0, 67, 29	0, 100, 81, 4	0, 0, 0, 27
RGB	0, 0, 0, 0	19, 73, 145	211, 142, 0	0, 124, 90	204, 32, 48	195, 196, 198

== Historical coats of arms ==
State of the Teutonic Order

Duchy of Courland and Semigallia

Courland Governorate

Swedish Livonia

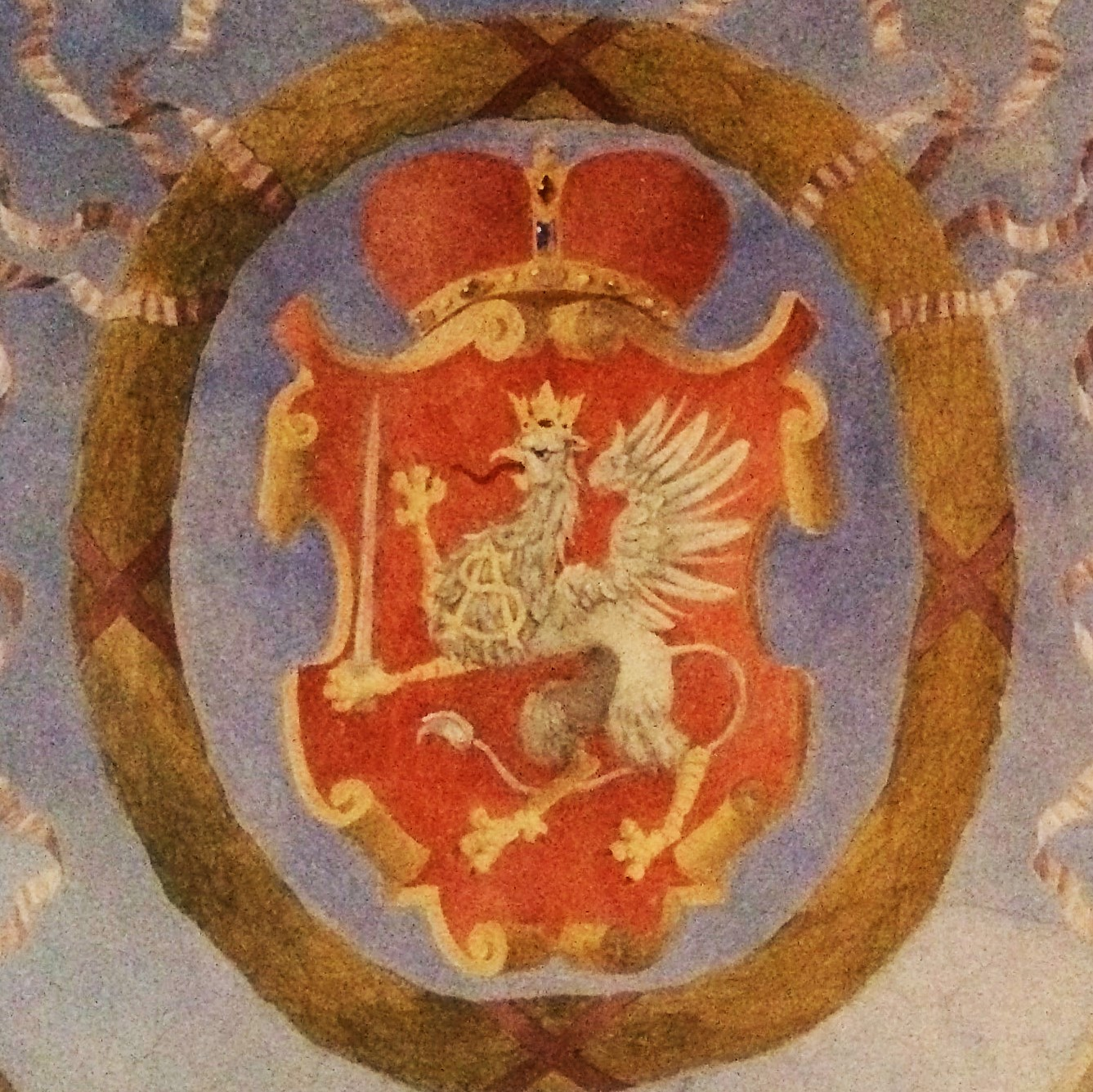
Polish Livonia

Governorate of Livonia

Latvian Socialist Soviet Republic

Emblem of the Latvian Soviet Socialist Republic

== See also ==
- Flag of Latvia
- National anthem of Latvia
- Freedom Monument (Riga)
- Armorial of Latvia
