= List of flags of Latvia =

The following is a list of flags of Latvia.

== National flag and state flag ==
Flag	Date	Use	Description
	2019–present	Digital flag	Dimensions: 10 horizontally and 2:1:2 vertically.
	1990–present (1940–1990 de jure)	State flag and civil ensign	Dimensions: 10 horizontally and 2:1:2 vertically.

== Governmental standards ==
Flag	Date	Use	Description
	1923–1940; 1995–present	Presidential standard	
	1995–present	Speaker of the Saeima	
	1995–present	Prime minister's standard	
	2002–present	Defence minister	

== Military flags ==
Flag	Date	Use	Description
	1991–present 1919–1940	Naval ensign	
	1991–present 1919–1940	Naval jack	
	?–present	Flag of the commander-in-chief of the army	Like the naval ensign, but with the naval jack in canton
	?–present	Flag of the commander-in-chief of the naval forces	Like the naval ensign, but with the naval ensign in canton
	?–present	Flotilla admiral's flag	
	?–present	Rear admiral's flag	
	?–present	Border guard	

== Military pennants ==
Flag	Date	Use	Description
	?–present	Flotilla commander's pennant	
	?–present	Squadron commander's pennant	
	?–present	Division commander's pennant	
	?–present	Warship pennant	

== Administrative divisions ==
=== Cities / Towns ===
Flag	Date	Use	Description
	1673–present	Flag of Riga	
	1937–present	Flag of Daugavpils	
	1938–present	Flag of Jelgava	
	1990–present	Flag of Jūrmala	
	1938–present	Flag of Liepāja	
		Flag of Ogre	
		Flag of Rēzekne	
	1993–present	Flag of Ventspils	

== Historical flags ==
Flag	Date	Use	Description
	1953–1990	Flag of the Latvian Soviet Socialist Republic (obverse and reverse)	All flags of the constituent republics of the Soviet Union did not bear the hammer and sickle on their reverse side.
	1940–1941; 1945–1953	Flag of the Latvian Soviet Socialist Republic	Red flag with the gold hammer and sickle in the canton, with the Latin characters LPSR.
	1919–1920	Flag of the short-lived Latvian Socialist Soviet Republic	
	1919	Flag of the Iron Division	
	1917	Reconstructed flag of the 5th Army Congress in Daugavpils, used by Latvian soldiers on May 17, 1917	A red flag with a white band at the middle (1:1:1 vertical dimensions), with a heart symbol pierced with a sword. The inscription in old orthography reads God bless Latvia (Dievs, svētī Latviju).
	1917–1918	Flag of the Iskolat	
	1808–1918	Landesfarben tricolours of German-speaking student societies Curonia (1808–1939) and Livonia (1920–1939), unofficial symbols of the Courland Governorate (banned by Russian authorities 1821–1862, 1887–1904, 1915–1918)	A horizontal tricolour of green, blue, and white.
	1820–1918	Landesfarben tricolours of German-speaking student societies Curonia (1808–1939) and Livonia (1920–1939), unofficial symbols of the Courland Governorate (banned by Russian authorities 1821–1862, 1887–1904, 1915–1918)	A horizontal tricolour of red, green, and white.
	1562–1795	Flag of the Duchy of Courland and Semigallia	
	1562–1795	Merchant ensign of the Duchy of Courland and Semigallia	
	1650s–1680s	Merchant ensign of the Duchy of Courland and Semigallia	Known as "Crab Flag" (Krabju karogs)

== Political flags ==
Flag	Date	Party	Description
current
	1990–present	Latvian Green Party	
	2010–present	Latgale Party	The flag was created as an unofficial flag of the historical land of Latgale, gaining widespread use and later adopted by the party.
	2003–present	National Power Unity	
former
	2006–2011	All for Latvia!	
	1946–1949	Communist Party of Latvia	
	1929–1940s	Mazpulki^{lv}	Latvia 4-H section.
	1995–2000s	Pērkonkrusts	
	1933–1944	Pērkonkrusts	
	1990s–2000s	Latvian National Democratic Party^{lv}	

== Ethnic group flags ==
Flag	Date	Use	Description
	1988–present 1923–1941	Flag of Livonians	A tricolor flag with green at top, a narrow white band at the middle, and blue at the bottom.
	2010–present	Flag of Latgalians	A dark blue flag with a narrow white band at the middle. Adopted as official flag of Latgale in April 2023.
	2000–present	Flag of Selonians	A tricolor flag with red at top, a narrow white band at the middle, and green at the bottom. Adopted as official flag of Selonia in April 2023.
	2023–present	Flag of Semigallians	A dark green flag with a narrow white band at the middle. Adopted as official flag of Semigallia in September 2023.
	1991–present 1918–1941	Flag of Baltic Germans	A bicolor flag with blue at the top and white at the bottom.
	2005–present	Flag of Latvian Russians (rarely used)	A light purple flag with a narrow white band at the middle.

== Proposed flags ==
Flag	Date	Use	Description
	1917	Jānis Grosvalds' proposal, intended for the Latvian Riflemen in their advance towards Jelgava	
	1917	Diplomat Oļģerts Grosvalds' proposal, intended for the Latvian Riflemen	
	2024	Flag of the Historical Latvian Land of Kurzeme (Courland), proposed by A. Kuzmins.	A tricolor flag with red at top, a narrow white band at the middle, and black at the bottom.
	2024	Flag of the Historical Latvian Land of Vidzeme, proposed by A. Kuzmins.	A tricolor flag with red at top, a narrow white band at the middle, and gold at the bottom.

== House flags ==
Flag	Date	Use	Description
	1836–1947	Flag of Riga Steamship Company^{de}	A red five-pointed star, off-center towards the flag pole, on a white field.

== See also ==
- Armorial of Latvia
