= Armorial of Latvia =

Heraldic visual designs displayed in Latvia

This is a list of current coat of arms of Latvia, its historical lands, state cities, and municipalities.

The present coats of arms of Latvia are regulated under local authorities and the State Heraldic Commission (Valsts heraldikas komisija). The latter is the national heraldic authority under the President since 14 February 1994, which traced to the Heraldic Commission of the Latvian SSR from November 1988, and the Regulations on the Procedure for Renewal and Approval of Municipal Historic Coats of Arms in the Latvian Soviet Socialist Republic issued in February 1989 that intended to restore pre-Soviet coats of arms in Latvia.

== National ==
Coat of arms of Latvia

Small enhanced coat of arms

Small coat of arms

== Historical Lands ==
Courland

Semigallia

Selonia

Vidzeme

Latgallia

== State cities (with independent government) ==
Daugavpils

Jelgava (small)

Jelgava (great)

Jūrmala

Liepāja

Rēzekne

Riga

Ventspils

== Municipalities ==
Ādaži Municipality

Aizkraukle Municipality

Alūksne Municipality

Augšdaugava Municipality

Balvi Municipality

Bauska Municipality

Cēsis Municipality

Dobele Municipality

Gulbene Municipality

Jēkabpils Municipality

Jelgava Municipality

Krāslava Municipality

Kuldīga Municipality

Ķekava Municipality

Limbaži Municipality

Līvāni Municipality

Ludza Municipality

Madona Municipality

Mārupe Municipality

Ogre Municipality

Olaine Municipality

Preiļi Municipality

Rēzekne Municipality

Ropaži Municipality

Salaspils Municipality

Saldus Municipality

Saulkrasti Municipality

Sigulda Municipality

Smiltene Municipality

South Kurzeme Municipality

Talsi Municipality

Tukums Municipality

Valka Municipality

Valmiera Municipality

Ventspils Municipality

== Historical ==
=== National ===
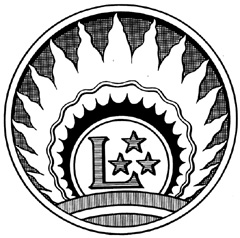
National Emblem (1918–1921, various variations were in use)

=== Counties (until 1949) ===
Abrene

Aizpute

Bauska

Cēsis

Daugavpils

Ilūkste

Jēkabpils

Jelgava

Kuldīga

Liepāja

Ludza

Madona

Rēzekne

Riga

Talsi

Tukums

Valka

Valmiera

Ventspils

== See also ==
- List of flags of Latvia
