= Inflanty =

Inflanty is the Polish name for Livonia and may refer to the following historical jurisdictions :

- Inflanty Voivodeship
- Duchy of Livonia
- Roman Catholic Diocese of Inflanty, a territorial division of the Roman Catholic Church established in 1186
