= Polish Livonia =

Polish Livonia may refer to:

- Duchy of Livonia, a dominion of the Grand Duchy of Lithuania and later the Polish-Lithuanian Commonwealth
- Inflanty Voivodeship, a district of the Duchy of Livonia (1561–1621) that was retained by the Polish-Lithuanian Commonwealth after the Treaty of Oliva in 1660

== See also ==
- Livonia, a historical region on the eastern shores of the Baltic Sea
