= Flag of Courland =

Former national flag

- Use: Duchy of Courland and Semigallia
- Proportion: 1:2
- Adopted: 1561; 465 years ago
- Relinquished: 1795; 231 years ago
- Design: A horizontal divided into red and white stripes

The flag is an unofficial symbol of the region of Courland in Northern Europe, and historically served as the symbol of the Duchy of Courland and Semigallia. Today, it has no official status in Latvia.

== History ==
=== Duchy of Courland and Semigallia (1561−1795) ===
The state flag of the Duchy of Courland and Semigallia (1561−1795) was a long rectangle with aspect ratio of 1:2. It was divided into equal horizontal stripes, red on top, and white on the bottom. The civil ensign also utilised the 1:2 ratio. It was divided into two square parts. The left part consisted of 4 red and white squares placed in the checkerboard pattern, with red squares being at the top left and bottom right, while the white squares being at the top right and bottom left. The right side consisted of two equally derived horizontal lines, red at the top, and right at the bottom.

During the reign of duke Jacob Kettler, which lasted from 1642 to 1682, the naval ensign flown by ships used during the Curonian colonisation of West Africa and Caribbean, was raspberry red with a crab on it. The version with a black eagle instead of a crab was also used.

There were also two other flags used by the state: a red flag with a white eagle, and a white flag with a black eagle.

=== Courland Governorate (1795–1918) ===
The flag used by the Courland Governorate (1795–1918), within the Russian Empire, was a rectangle divided into three equal stripes: green at the top, blue in centre, and white at the bottom.

== Gallery ==
The state flag of the Duchy of Courland and Semigallia (1561−1795).

The civil ensign of the Duchy of Courland and Semigallia (1561−1795).

The colonial naval flag of the Duchy of Courland and Semigallia used during the reign of Duke Jacob Kettler.

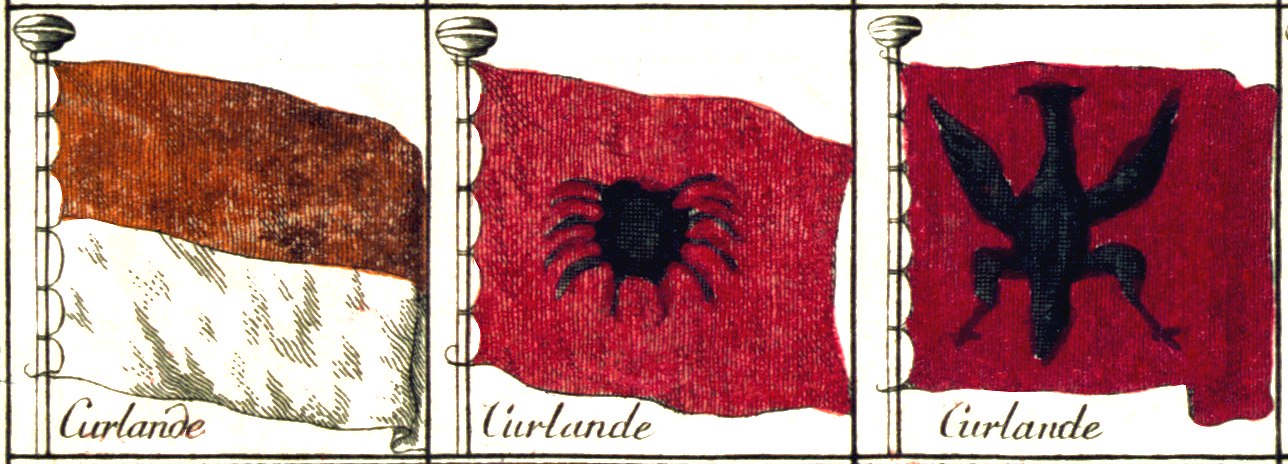
The flags of the Duchy of Courland and Semigallia as presented in 1783 Bowles's Universal Display of the Naval Flags.

The flag of the Courland Governorate (1795–1918).

== See also ==
- Coat of arms of Courland
- Flag of the Livonians
