= Emblem of the Latvian Soviet Socialist Republic =

Versions
- Emblem used by the Latvian Socialist Soviet Republic
- Armiger: Latvian Soviet Socialist Republic
- Adopted: 25 August 1940
- Crest: Red star
- Supporters: Wheat
- Motto: „Visu zemju proletārieši, savienojieties!“ (Latvian) «Пролетарии всех стран, соединяйтесь!» (Russian) ("Workers of the world, unite!")
- Designer: Arturs Apinis

The Emblem of the Latvian Soviet Socialist Republic was adopted on August 25, 1940, by the government of the Latvian SSR. It was based on the emblem of the Soviet Union. It features symbols of agriculture (wheat) and Latvia's maritime culture (a sunset over the Baltic Sea). The red star as well as the hammer and sickle for the victory of communism and the "world-wide socialist community of states".

The banner bears the USSR State motto ("Proletarians of all countries, unite!") in both Latvian language (Visu zemju proletārieši, savienojieties!) and Russian. The name of the Latvian SSR is shown only in Latvian, and reads Latvijas PSR, the PSR standing for Padomju Sociālistiskā Republika, or Soviet Socialist Republic.

Until 1978, a gold star was used in the state emblem.

The coat of arms of Latvia was restored in 1990. The use and exhibition of the emblem of the SSR is now banned in Latvia, due to a law approved in 2013.

== History ==
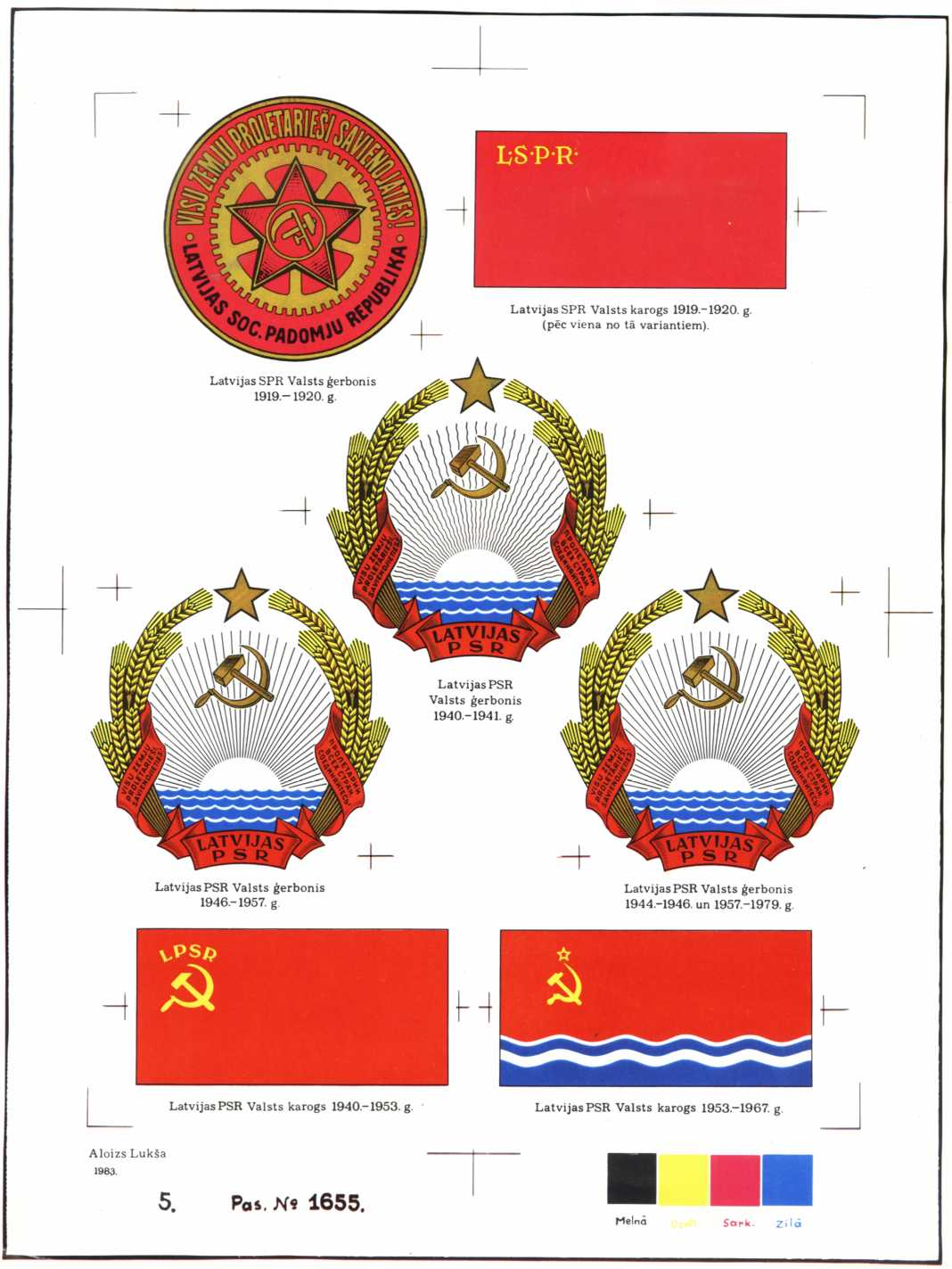
The revisions of the coat of arms of the Latvian SSR, from is creation until 1979.

In the period from the creation of Latvian SSR on July 21 to August 25, 1940, the coat of arms of the Republic of Latvia continued to be used. On August 17, 1940, postage stamps of the 10th standard issue were issued in accordance with the drawings of the artist Jānis Šternbergs with the image of the state small arms. On August 25, 1940, in the second session of the People's Saeima of the LSSR the Constitution of the Latvian SSR was approved, Article 116 of which described the coat of arms of the SSR:

The State Emblem of the Latvian Soviet Socialist Republic depicts a golden sickle and a hammer surrounded by ears in the rays of the sun rising from the sea, at the top of the emblem is a five-pointed golden star, on the ribbon, wrapping grain ears and inscriptions in Latvian: in the center — Latvijas PSR, and on the sides: Workers of the world, unite! in Latvian and Russian

In the description it is indicated that the sun "rises from the sea", but due to the geographical features of Latvia, located on the eastern coast of the Baltic Sea, the sun over the sea could be seen only in the west, i.e. on the sunset. This fact then became the reason for many jokes about the decline of socialism in Latvia.

The project of the emblem was created by graphic artist Arturs Apinis, a former pupil of Rihards Zariņš and a professor of the Art Academy of Latvia. Unlike the arms of the USSR and the arms of the majority of other SSRs, the hammer handle was located above the blade of the sickle, and not under it.

Most of the revisions after the creations of the coat of arms were barely noticeable.

The new edition of the Regulations on the State Emblem of the Latvian SSR, published in 1979, clarified that "the star is depicted in red" and a color and the outline of the state emblem of the Latvian SSR is given.

=== Restoration of the Latvian coat of arms ===
On July 28, 1989, the Supreme Soviet of the Latvian SSR adopted the declaration "On State Sovereignty of the Latvian SSR". Later, on February 15, 1990, the Supreme Soviet of the Latvian SSR adopted "On the State Emblem of the Latvian SSR", thus restored the pre-war Coat of arms of Latvia as the official coat of arms.

== See also ==
- Coat of arms of Latvia
