= Jacob Johan Hastfer =

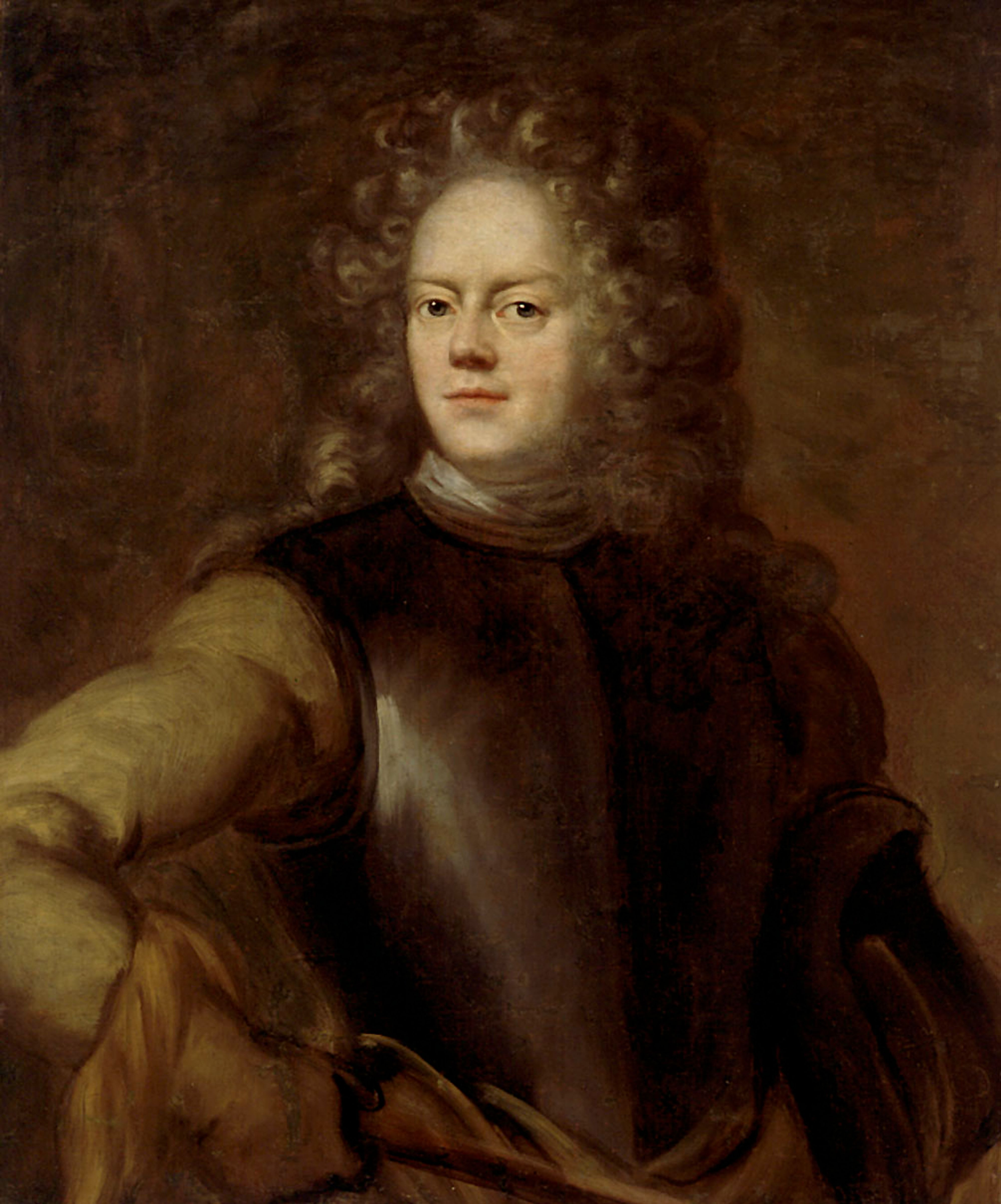
Jacob Johan Hastfer

Jacob Johan Hastfer (11 December 1647 Tallinn – 24 December 1695 Riga) was a Swedish officer and governor of the Livonia province between 1687 and 1695.
