= Tomasz Sapieha =

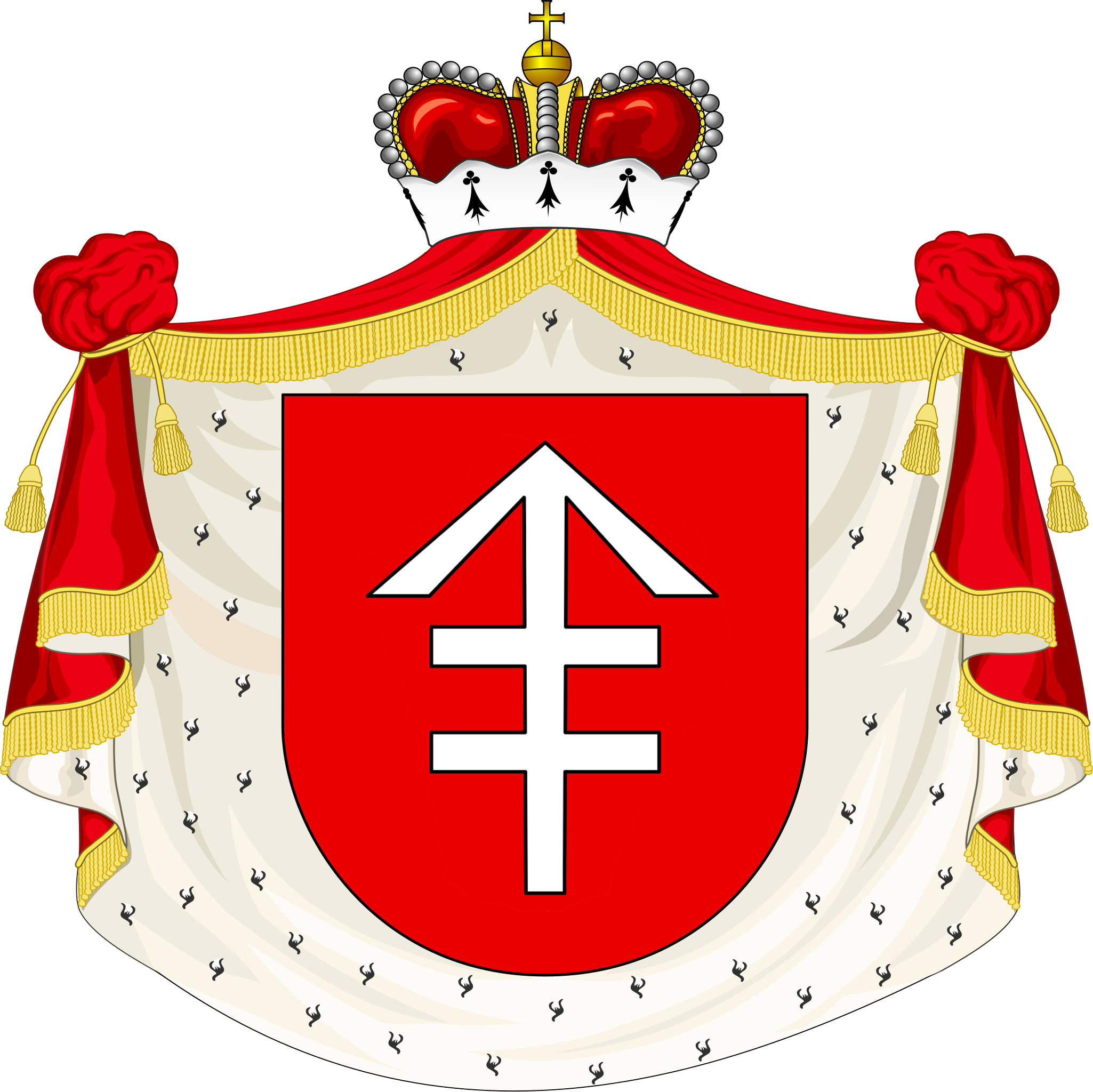
Coat of arms of Sapieha family

Tomasz Sapieha (1598 – April 1646) was a Polish–Lithuanian Commonwealth noble and politician. Voivode of Wenden (1641–1643), Voivode of Nowogródek (1643–1646).

== Biography ==
He was the son of Mikołaj Sapieha, brother of Kazimierz Mikołaj Sapieha.

From 1617 he studied in a Jesuit college in Lublin; from 1619 to 1621 at the Academy of Cracow. From 1621 to 1625 he studied abroad, in Padua, Bologne and Leuven.

After returning to his homeland, he stayed at the court of the Polish king, Zygmunt III Waza. In 1632 he lost his hand in a duel with Jerzy Zenonowicz. He nonetheless took part in the Smolensk War, sponsoring a hussaria chorągiew.

In 1640 he was elected the president of the Lithuanian Tribunal. In 1641 he became the Voivode of Wenden, and in 1643, Voivode of Nowogródek. In 1643 he was also one of the negotiators, chosen by Sejm, for the Polish-Muscovite negotiations.

He died in Vilnius between 2 and 8 April 1646.
