= Wenden Voivodeship =

Voivodeship of the Polish–Lithuanian Commonwealth

Coordinates: 57°18′34″N 25°16′22″E

Wenden Voivodeship Województwo wendeńskie Vendeno vaivadija
- Voivodeship of Livonia^{1}
- 1598–1621
- Coat of arms

- Wenden Voivodeship in the Duchy of Livonia.
- Capital: Wenden
- Area
- 30,000 km^{2} (12,000 sq mi)
- History
  - Established: 1598
  - Polish–Swedish War: 1621
Succeeded by
Swedish Livonia; Inflanty Voivodeship
- ^{1} The Duchy of Livonia was a vassal to the Grand Duchy of Lithuania until the Union of Lublin in 1569, and after that a part of the Polish–Lithuanian Commonwealth.

Wenden Voivodeship (Polish: Województwo wendeńskie, Lithuanian: Vendeno vaivadija) was a unit of administrative division and local government in the Duchy of Livonia, part of the Polish–Lithuanian Commonwealth. It was formed in 1598 by King Sigismund III Vasa, out of Wenden Presidency (Province), which had been created in 1582 by King Stephen Báthory, after the Truce of Yam-Zapolsky. The voivodeship remained in the Commonwealth until the Swedish Empire's conquest of Livonia in the 1620s. The unconquered remainder of Livonia was named Inflanty Voivodeship, and continued to be part of the Commonwealth until its first partition in 1772.

Officially, Wenden Voivodeship belonged to Poland–Lithuania until the Treaty of Oliva in 1660. Its capital was Wenden, where local sejmiks of the nobility (see szlachta) took place. Wenden Voivodeship elected two deputies to the Sejm of the Polish–Lithuanian Commonwealth. Even though it no longer belonged to the Commonwealth after the Swedish conquest, its voivodes continued to be named by Polish kings until the final partition of Poland (1795), as the so-called "fictitious titles" (Polish: urzędy fikcyjne).

Major cities, towns and castles of Wenden Voivodeship were: Cēsis (Kies, Wenden), Riga, Koknese (Kokenhausen), Salaspils (Kircholm), Daugavpils (Dyneburg), Rēzekne (Rzezyca, Rositten), Viļaka (Marienhausen), Gulbene (Schwanenburg), Ludza (Lucyn), Krustpils (Kreutzburg).

== Voivodes of Wenden ==
The seat of the voivode was Wenden (Cēsis). The voivodes were as follow:

- 1598–1602 Jürgen von Farensbach
- 1602–1602 Maciej Dembiński
- 1609–1619 Krzysztof Słuszka
- 1620–1622 Teodor Denhoff
- 1627–1641 Joachim Tarnowski
- 1641–1643 Tomasz Sapieha
- 1643–1659 Mikołaj Korff
- 1659–1660 Aleksander Morsztyn

== Bibliography ==
- Mikulski, Krzysztof; Rachuba, Andrzej (1994). Urzędnicy inflanccy XVI-XVIII wieku. Spisy. Urzędnicy dawnej Rzeczypospolitej XII-XVIII wieku. Spisy. Vol. 9. Kórnik.
