= Rihards Zariņš =

Latvian graphic artist (1869–1939)

Rihards Zarins
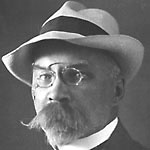
- Rihards Zariņš
- Born: 27 June 1869; Kocēni, Russian Empire
- Died: 21 April 1939 (aged 69); Riga, Latvia
- Other names: Zarriņš, Richards; Sarrinsch, Richard
- Occupation: Latvian graphic artist

Rihards Zariņš (also Richards Zarriņš or Richard Sarrinsch in German; 27 June 1869 – 21 April 1939) was a Latvian graphic artist.

== Life ==
He was born in Kocēni and grew up in Līgatne and later in Grīva. He pursued his studies in St. Petersburg, where he graduated in 1895 from the Stieglitz Central School for Technical Drawing. He then went on to further studies in Berlin, Munich, Vienna, where he studied lithography, and Paris, where he honed his skills in watercolour and pastels.

Work register recording a design for a 100-ruble credit note, 1908.

He returned to Russia where he was employed by the Russian Imperial Printing Office in St. Petersburg for 20 years, acting as technical director. From 1905 he was in charge of designing state papers. In 1919, he returned to newly independent Latvia where he was appointed director of the government printing house. He held that position for over 14 years and retired at the beginning of 1934. After a stroke, he lost his ability to speak; however, he continued to draw until the last day of his life.

== Œuvre ==
Zariņš was one of the best-known Latvian graphic artists. His first works appeared in the early 1890s on the pages of the then-popular Latvian-language magazine, Austrums (The East), when he was still a student at the Stieglitz art school. He dedicated a great amount of time in the study of folk ornamentation, and under his leadership, the state publishers produced a monumental work on Latvian decorative arts.

During his career, the artist designed many stamps of the Russian Empire, Soviet Russia, Belarusian People’s Republic, and Latvia. He is an author of the very first Soviet stamps issued in 1918.

Zariņš was a prolific artist who produced many book illustrations, engravings and lithographs. His oeuvre also contains drawings, water-colour painting, and caricatures. Among his works of applied art are the design of the Latvian coat of arms (with his student Vilhelms Krūmiņš) as well as several designs for bank notes issued by the Printing Office, and several coins of the Latvian lats.

== Gallery ==
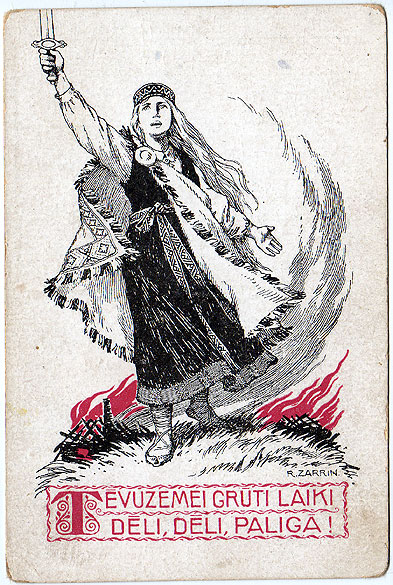
World War I propaganda postcard by Zariņš

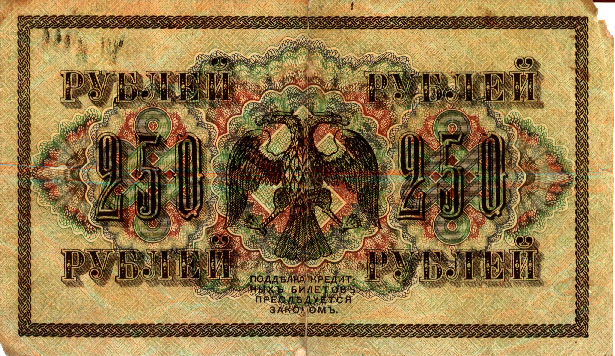
The 250-ruble banknote issued by the Russian provisional government in 1917 was designed by Zariņš

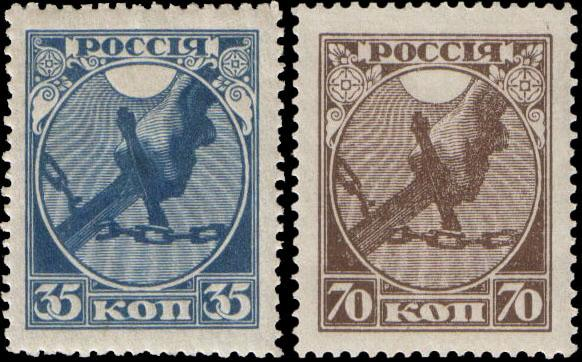
First stamps of Soviet Russia, 1918

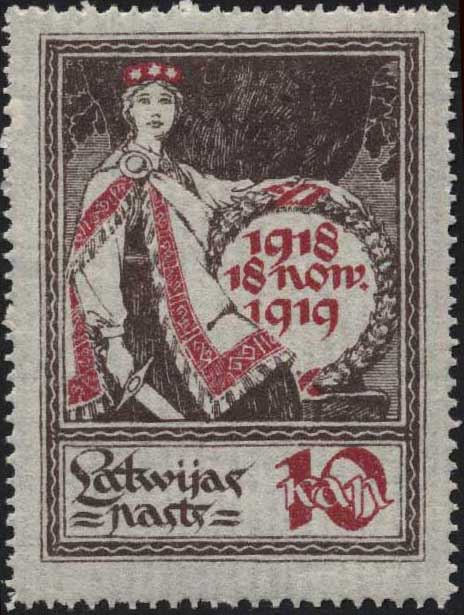
Stamp of Latvia conmemorating the 1st anniversary of Latvian independence, 1919

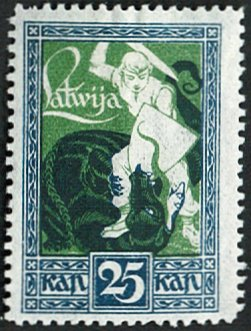
Stamp of Latvia, 1919

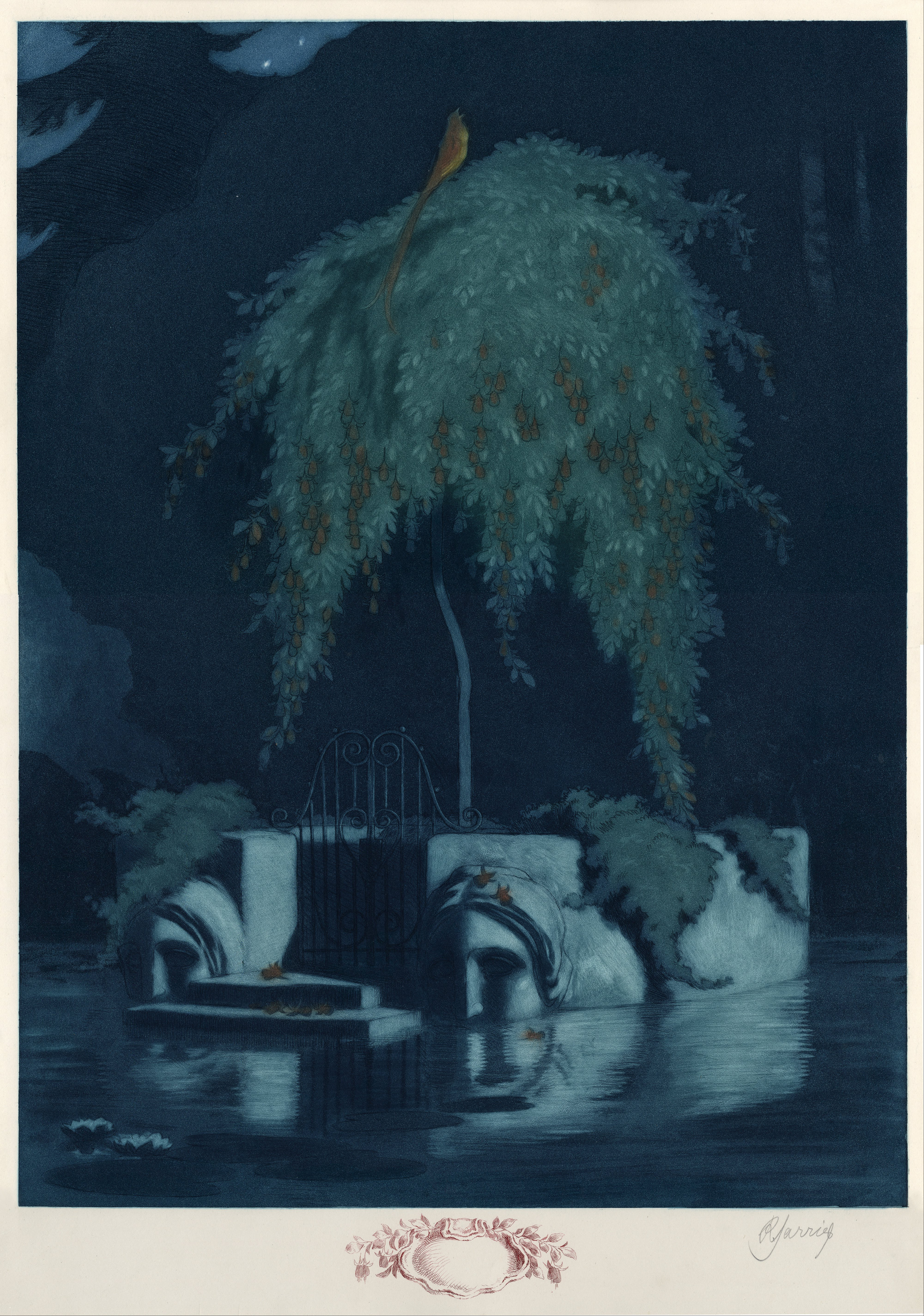
Poet's tomb (1913)
