= Flag of the Livonians =

Flag of the Livonian people

Flag of the Livonians

The flag of the Livonians (Livonian: Līvõd plagā; Latvian: Līvu karogs) is a flag used to symbolize the Livonian people. It is in use of various Livonian cultural groups. The flag's proportions are 2:1:2 and the ratio of the height of the flag to its width is fixed at 1:2, similarly to the Flag of Latvia.

The green represents forests, white represents the shore (of the Livonian coast) and blue represents the sea. These represent Livonian fishing culture, and the colors symbolize the view of a fisherman when he looks to the coast. The flag was first used by the Livonian Society (Līvõd Īt) on November 18, 1923.

== Gallery ==
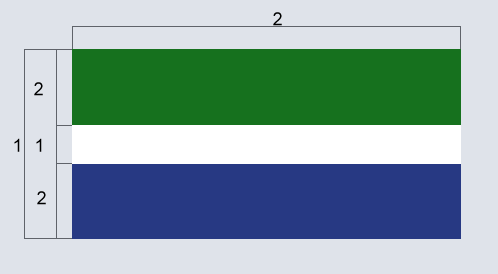
Flag proportions

Flag of the historical student corporation Livonia and the Duchy of Livonia

Flag of Latvia, on which this flag was based.
