= Courland =

Historical region in Latvia

Courland Kurzeme (Latvian) Kurāmō (Livonian)
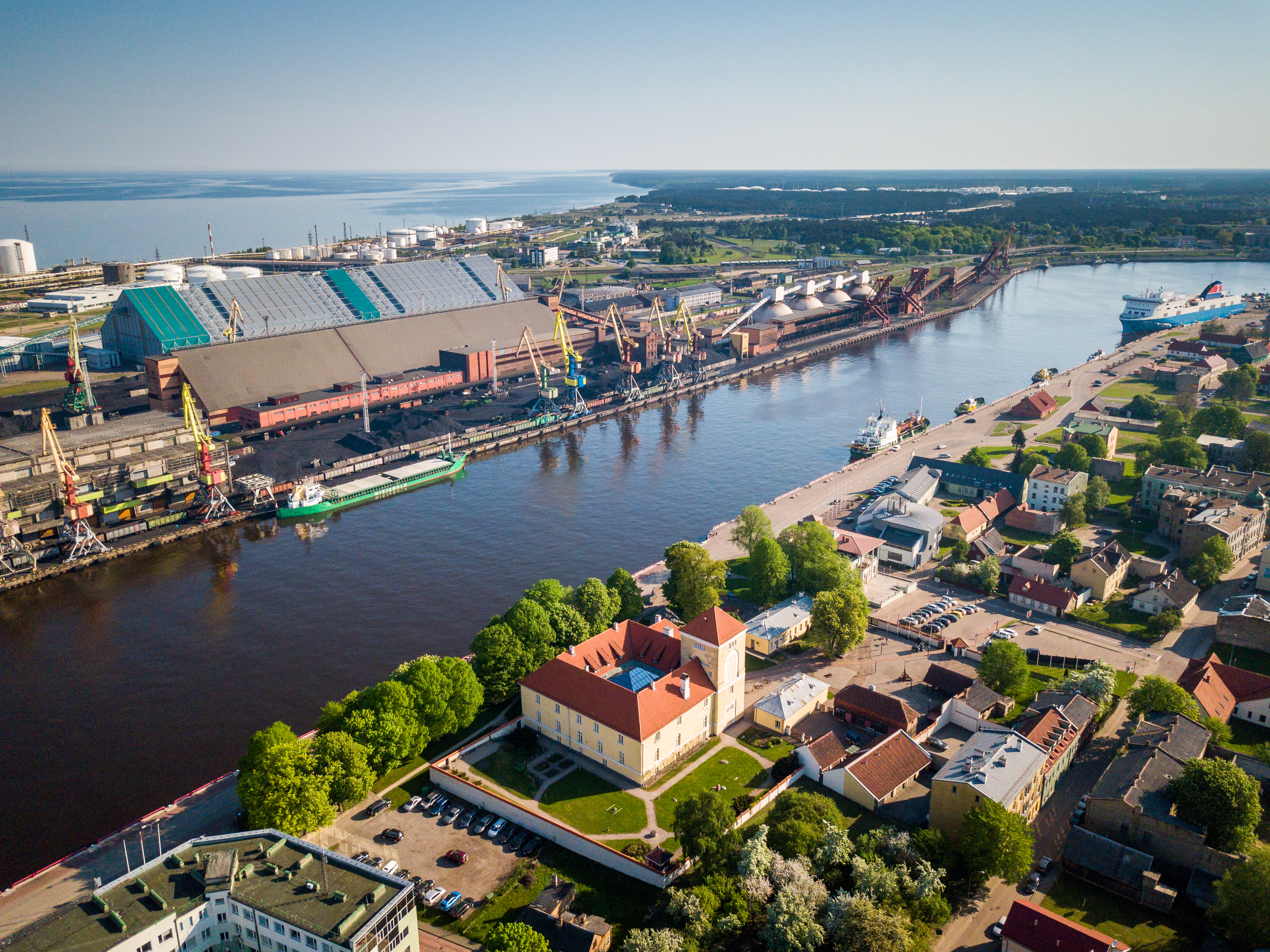
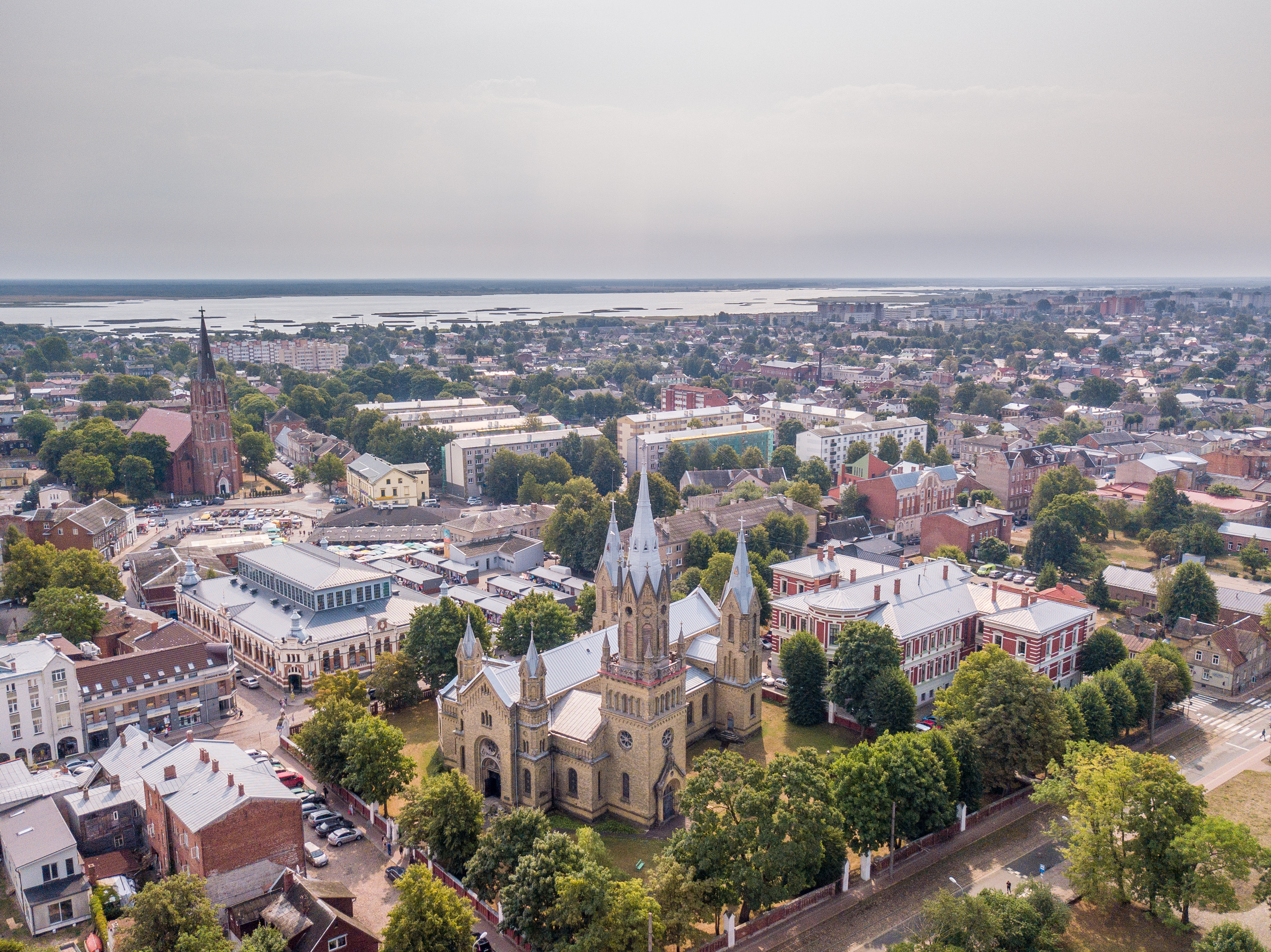
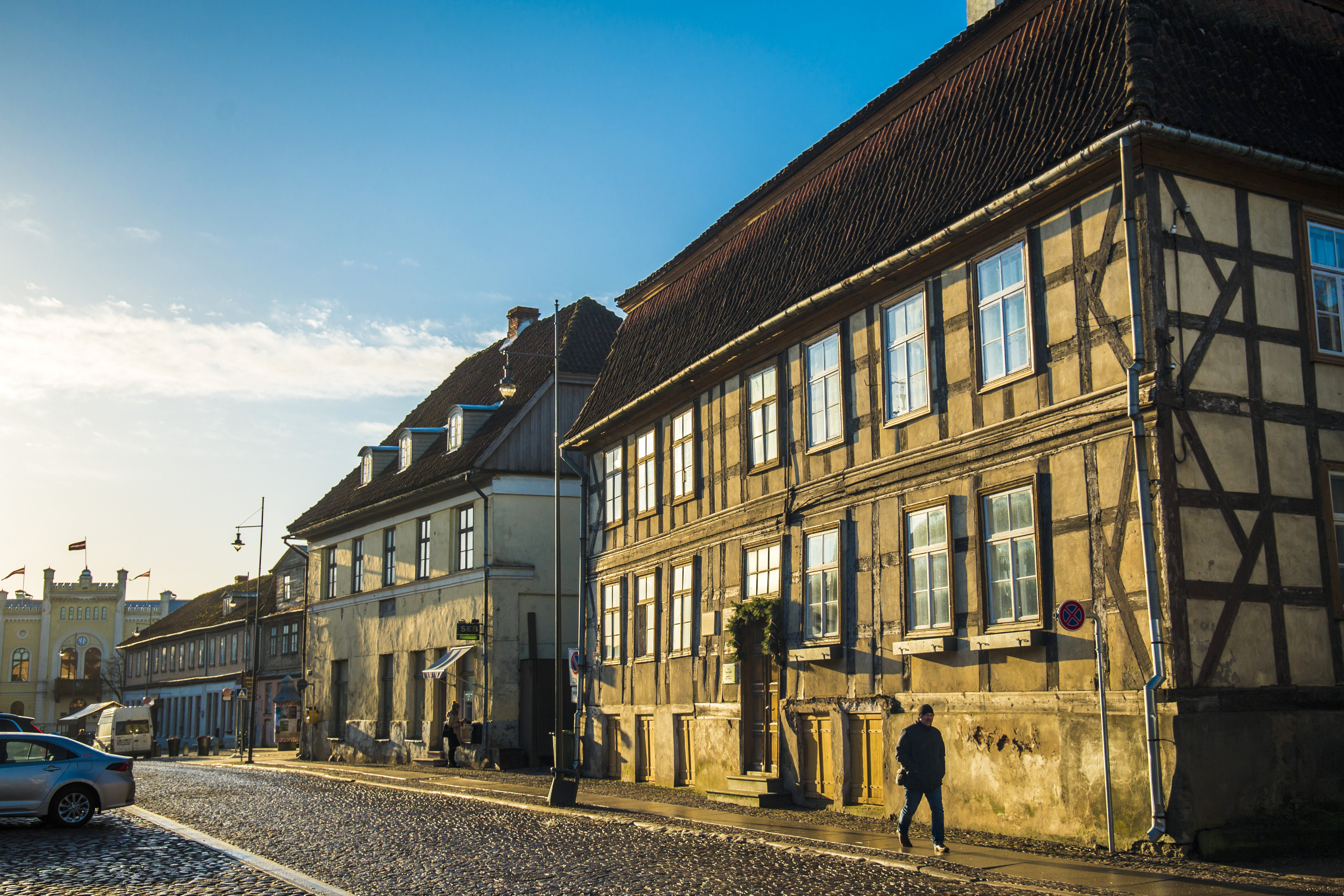
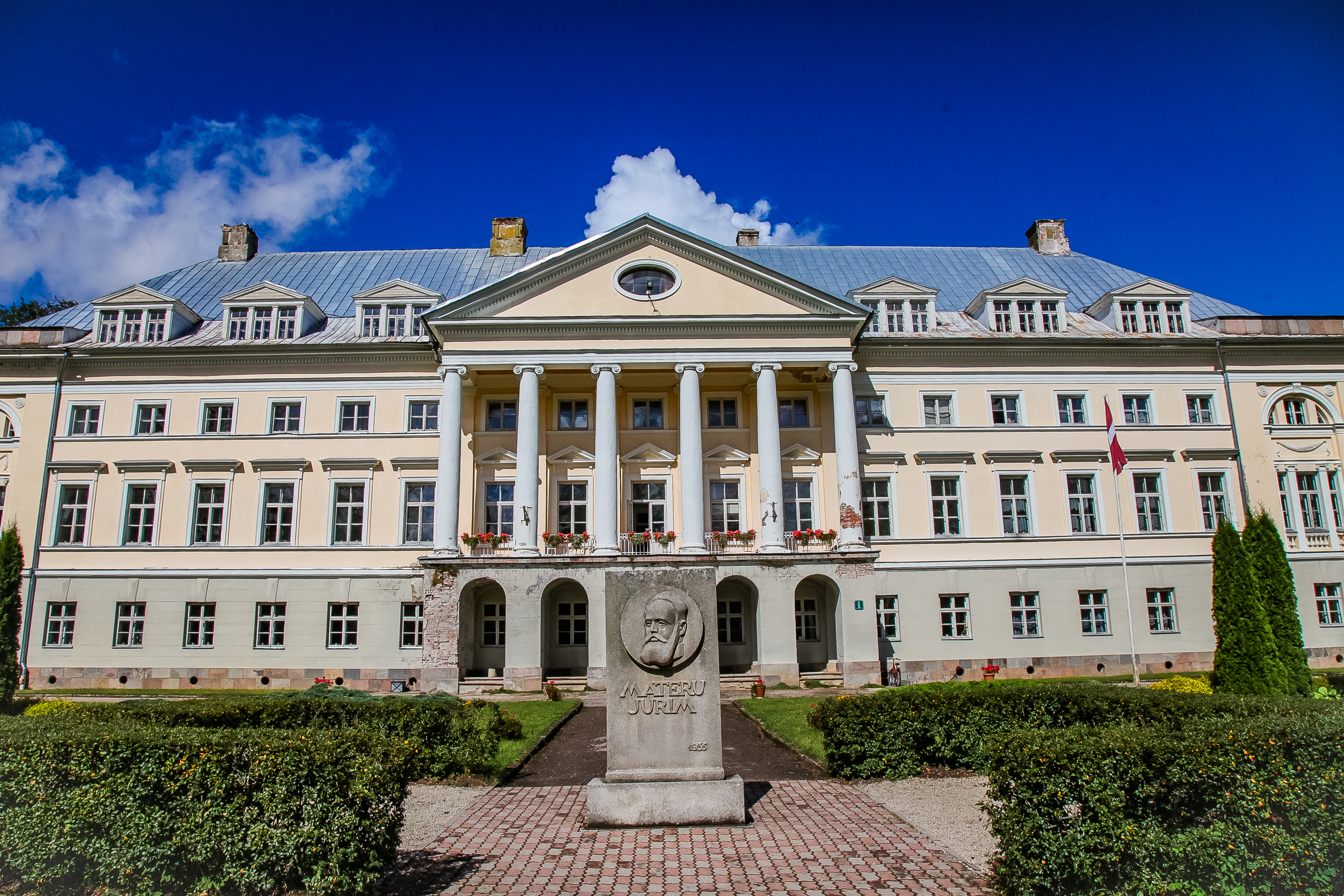
- From top, left to right: Ventspils; Liepāja; Kuldīga; Kazdanga Palace

- Flag Coat of arms

- Location of Courland in Latvia
- Coordinates: 57°0′0″N 22°0′0″E
- Country: Latvia
- First mention: 6th century
- Capital: Kuldīga
- Largest city: Liepāja
- Time zone: UTC+2 (EET)
  - Summer (DST): UTC+3 (EEST)

Courland (Note: /ˈkʊərlənd/; Latvian: Kurzeme; Livonian: Kurāmō; German and Scandinavian languages: Kurland; Latin: Curonia/Couronia; Russian: Курляндия; Finnish: Kuurinmaa; Estonian: Kuramaa; Lithuanian: Kuršas; Polish: Kurlandia) is one of the Historical Latvian Lands in western Latvia. Courland's largest city is Liepāja, which is the third largest city in Latvia.

The literal meaning of the name is "Land of Curonians".

== Geography and climate ==
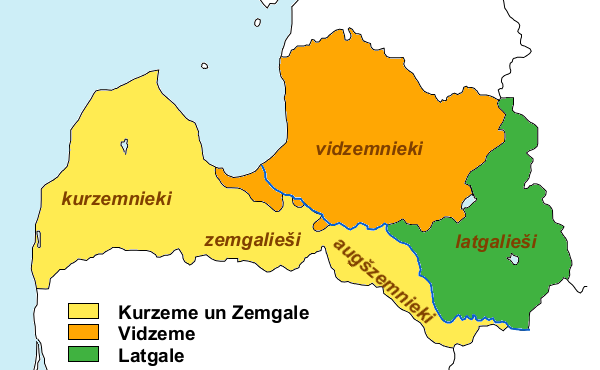
Historical regions of Latvia, together with Latvian cultural groups; Courland (Kurzeme) and Semigallia (Zemgale) in yellow

Situated in western Latvia, Courland roughly corresponds to the former Latvian districts of Kuldīga, Liepāja, Saldus, Talsi, Tukums and Ventspils.

When combined with Semigallia and Selonia, Courland's northeastern boundary is the Daugava River, which separates it from the regions of Latgale and Vidzeme. To the north, Courland's coast lies along the Gulf of Riga. On the west it is bordered by the Baltic Sea, and on the south by Lithuania. It lies between 55° 45′ and 57° 45′ North and 21° and 27° East.

The name is also found in the Curonian Spit and Lithuanian Karšuvos giria - the Courland wood.

The area comprises 27,286 square kilometres (10,535 sq mi), of which 262 square kilometres (101 sq mi) is made up of lakes. The landscape generally has a low and undulating character, with flat and marshy coastlands. The interior features wooded dunes, covered with pine, spruce, birch, and oak, with swamps and lakes, and fertile patches between. Courland's elevation never rises more than 213 metres (699 ft) above sea level.

The Jelgava plain divides Courland into two parts, the western side, which is fertile and densely inhabited, except in the north, and the eastern side, less fertile and thinly inhabited.

Nearly one hundred rivers drain Courland, but only three of these rivers – the Daugava, the Lielupe and the Venta – are navigable. They all flow northwestward and discharge into the Baltic Sea.

Owing to its numerous lakes and marshes, Courland has a damp, often foggy, and changeable climate; its winters are severe.

== History ==
The early history of Courland (Latvian: Kurzeme) is the story of the Curonians (Latvian: Kurši), a medieval Baltic tribe renowned for their maritime prowess and fierce resistance to foreign conquest. Their history, culminating in their subjugation by the early 14th century, is documented primarily by chronicles of their adversaries.

=== Origins and Pagan (Pre-Christian) Society ===
The Curonians were a Baltic tribe inhabiting the shores of the Baltic Sea from before the 5th to the 16th centuries, in what are now the western parts of Latvia and Lithuania. They eventually merged with other Baltic tribes, contributing to the ethnogenesis of present-day Latvians and Lithuanians. The Curonians gave their name to the region of Courland (Kurzeme) They possessed a strong warrior culture and are considered by some researchers to be eastern Baltic, while others believe they were related to the Old Prussians of the western Baltic group. Some of the most important written sources about them are Rimbert's Vita Ansgarii, the Livonian Chronicle of Henry, the Livländische Reimchronik, Egils Saga, and Saxo Grammaticus's Gesta Danorum. During the late Iron Age, the Curonians began moving from southern Courland to the north, assimilating a Finnic people who lived there and forming a new ethnic group known as the Curonised Livonians.

=== The Northern Crusades and Curonian Resistance ===
The Livonian Crusades, aimed at converting the pagan peoples of the eastern Baltic, brought the Curonians into direct and prolonged conflict with German crusading orders. Before the crusades, the region was a mixed society where merchants from the Hanseatic League encountered those from Novgorod, and various trade, cultures, and religions mingled.. The specific indigenous groups included the Estonians, Livonians, Curonians, Semigallians, Selonians, Latgalians, and Lithuanians The Livonian Chronicle of Henry, a key source for the period, describes events in Livonia (roughly modern Estonia and Latvia) from 1180 to 1227, including the conquest of Livonian territories and wars with the Curonians and Lithuanians.

The Curonians mounted a staunch resistance to the Livonian Crusade for a long time. In 1210, a Curonian fleet of eight ships was attacked by a German crusader fleet near the coast of Gotland. They were involved in further conflicts, attacking Riga again in 1228 alongside the Semigallians; while they failed to take the city, they destroyed a monastery in Daugavgriva and killed all the monks there. Following the defeat of the Estonians and Osilians in 1227, the Curonians were pressured by Lithuanian enemies to the east and south, harassed by the Livonian Brothers of the Sword from the north, and threatened by Danes and Swedes on the sea.

=== Subjugation and Partition ===
The turning point for Curonian independence came after the major defeat of the Livonian Order by the Samogitians at the Battle of Durbe in 1260. This defeat prompted uprisings against the crusaders in the Curonian and Prussian lands. However, this renewed resistance was ultimately crushed. Curonian resistance was finally subdued in 1266 when the whole of Courland was partitioned between the Livonian Order and the Archbishop of Riga. Despite this conquest, the Curonian nobles, including 40 clans of descendants of Curonian chieftains living in the town of Kuldīga, were able to preserve their personal freedom and some privileges. By this time, Curonian lands were conquered by the Livonian Order, and the people gradually merged with other Baltic tribes, marking the end of their political autonomy but not their cultural legacy.

=== Livonian Confederation ===
The Livonian Confederation was a loosely organized confederation formed by the German-led Livonian Order and various bishoprics that encompassed much of present-day Estonia and Latvia. It existed from 1228 to the 1560s, when it was dismembered by the Tsardom of Russia during the Livonian War.

=== Duchy of Courland and the Polish–Lithuanian Commonwealth, 1561–1795 ===
The Duchy of Courland and Semigallia and the District of Pilten as it appeared in 1740

The Duchy of Courland and Semigallia was a semi-independent duchy that existed from 1561 until 1795, encompassing the areas of Courland and Semigallia. Although nominally a vassal state of the Polish–Lithuanian Commonwealth, the dukes operated autonomously. In the 18th century, Russia acquired great influence over the Duchy; the future Empress Anna of Russia served as regent there from 1711 until her accession to the Russian throne in 1730. After the last of the ducal line into which she had married died in 1737, she arranged for the Duchy to be given to her lover, Ernst Johann von Biron instead.

The Duchy was one of the smallest European nations to colonize overseas territories, establishing short-lived outposts on the Caribbean islands of Tobago and Trinidad and at the mouth of the Gambia River in Africa on what was then known as James Island.

In 1795, the last Duke, Peter von Biron, ceded the Duchy to the Russian Empire.

The former Bishopric of Courland was directly incorporated into the Polish–Lithuanian Commonwealth as the District of Pilten of the Wenden and later Inflanty Voivodeship.

=== Courland as part of the Russian Empire ===
After annexation by the Russian Empire, the territory of the former Duchy formed the Courland Governorate.

From the time of the Northern Crusades in the early 13th century, most land was owned by nobles descended from the German invaders. In 1863, the Russian authorities issued laws to enable Latvians, who formed the bulk of the population, to acquire the farms which they held, and special banks were founded to help them. By this means, some occupants bought their farms, but the great mass of the population remained landless, and lived as hired labourers, occupying a low position in the social scale.

Agriculture was the chief occupation, with the principal crops being rye, barley, oats, wheat, flax, and potatoes. The large estates conducted agriculture with skill and scientific knowledge. Fruit grew well. Excellent breeds of cattle, sheep and pigs were kept. Liepāja and Jelgava operated as the principal industrial centres, with ironworks, agricultural machinery works, tanneries, glass and soap works. Flax spinning took place mostly as a domestic industry. Iron and limestone were the chief minerals; a little amber was found on the coast. The only seaports were Liepāja, Ventspils and Palanga, there being none on the Courland coast of the Gulf of Riga.

==== Population ====
Residents of Courland by ethnicity (2022)
Latvians	77.5%
Russians	13.3%
Lithuanians	2.5%
Ukrainians	2.3%
Belarusians	1.9%
Poles	0.6%
Others	1.9%

In 1870 the population was 619,154; in 1897 it was 674,437 (of whom 345,756 were women); in 1906 it was estimated at 714,200. Of the whole, 79% were Latvians, 8.4% Baltic Germans, about 8% Jews, 1.4% Russians, 1% Lithuanians, 1% Poles, and some Livonians.

The chief towns of the ten districts were Jelgava (Mitau), Courland's capital (pop. 35,011 in 1897); Liepāja (Libau) (pop. 64,500 in 1897); Bauska (6,543); Jaunjelgava (Friedrichstadt) (5,223); Kuldīga (Goldingen) (9,733); Grobiņa (1,489); Aizpute (Hasenpoth) (3,338); Ilūkste (Illuxt) (2,340); Talsi (Talsen) (6,215); Tukums (Tuckum) (7542); and Ventspils (Windau) (7,132).

75% of the population belonged to the prevailing denomination, Lutheranism; the rest belonged to the Eastern Orthodox and Roman Catholic churches. There was a small but vigorous Jewish population.

=== Courland during World War I ===
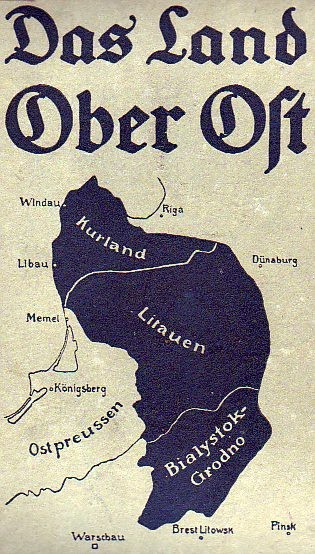
Public notice of the German Ober Ost region including Courland (Kurland) district in 1917

During World War I (1914-1915), Courland formed part of the Eastern Front theatre of operations that saw fighting primarily between forces of the Russian and German empires. Following the Great Retreat of Russian forces in 1915, Courland came under the control of the Imperial German Army. The Russian authorities of the Courland Governorate were evacuated to Tartu, never to return. Courland was thus placed under the German military administration, and included into the Ober Ost, commanded by field marshal Paul von Hindenburg and his deputy, general Erich Ludendorff, who was charged with effective managing of all administrative affairs in large areas now under the Ober Ost jurisdiction. Courland District (which included parts of Semigallia) was made one of several districts of the Ober Ost. The first district administrator was Alfred von Gossler, who governed over Courland from the autumn of 1915 up to August 1918.

As Russian rule in the rest of what is now Latvia began collapsing in 1917, Baltic Germans initiated a process of forming provincial councils between September 1917 and March 1918, competing with ethnic Latvians' moves toward independence. With the Treaty of Brest-Litovsk of 3 March 1918, the new Soviet Russia formally relinquished sovereignty over all lands to the west of the agreed demarcation line, thus effectively recognising German control over the vast region that included Courland, and also Lithuania and Poland. Already on 8 March 1918, the Duchy of Courland and Semigallia was proclaimed a Baltic German Landesrat, offering the ducal crown to German emperor Wilhelm II. Germany recognised the independence of Courland that same month, but in reality the Duchy was operating as a German client state. On 5 November 1918, Courland was integrated into a wider Baltic polity, known as the United Baltic Duchy, but that attempted state failed to become a reality, since Germany lost the war on 11 November.

=== Courland as part of interbellum Latvia ===
On 18 November 1918, Latvia proclaimed its independence, and on 7 December 1918 the German military handed authority over all Latvian lands, including Courland, to the pro-German Latvian Provisional Government headed by Kārlis Ulmanis. By January 1919, much of Latvia, including Courland, had been overrun by the Bolsheviks' Latvian Socialist Soviet Republic, but the provisional government with the aid of German forces pushed back and took back Courland by April. Throughout the Latvian War of Independence, much of Courland remained a German stronghold. Latvia eventually signed a cease-fire with Germany on 15 July 1920, and the Latvian–Soviet Peace Treaty of 11 August ended the war.

After World War I, Courland became one of five provinces of the newly formed nation of Latvia. These provinces corresponded to Latvia's four traditional regions plus Riga. In 1935, Courland had an area of 13,210 square kilometres (5,099 sq mi) and a population of 292,659 making it the least populous of the provinces.

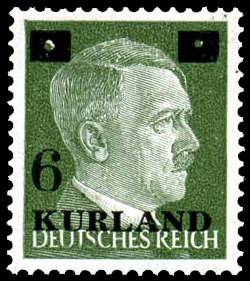
Postage stamp used in the Courland Pocket (1945)

=== Courland during and after World War II ===
Historical affiliations of Courland
Curonian lands until the 13th century
Terra Mariana; 13th century-1561
Grand Duchy of Lithuania; 1561-1569
Polish–Lithuanian Commonwealth; 1569-1656	Duchy of Courland and Semigallia, vassal state of Poland and Lithuania; 1561-1795
Polish–Lithuanian Commonwealth; 1717-1795
Russian Empire; 1795-1812
Duchy of Courland, Semigallia and Pilten, client state of France; 1812
Russian Empire; 1812-1915
(German Empire) German Reich (occupation); 1915-1918
Duchy of Courland and Semigallia, client state of Germany; 1918
United Baltic Duchy, client state of Germany; 1918
Republic of Latvia; 1918-1940
Latvian SSR, republic of Soviet Union (occupation); 1940-1941
(Nazi Germany) German Reich (occupation); 1941-1944
Latvian SSR, republic of Soviet Union (occupation); 1944-1990
Republic of Latvia; 1990–present

The Soviet Army occupied Latvia in conformity with the terms of 1939 Molotov–Ribbentrop Pact on 17 June 1940. On 5 August 1940, the Soviet Union annexed the region along with the rest of Latvia which was made a constituent republic of the USSR, the Latvian SSR.

At the start of Operation Barbarossa in the summer of 1941, the German Wehrmacht's Army Group North headed by Field Marshal Wilhelm Ritter von Leeb overran Courland, along with the rest of the Baltic littoral. During the German occupation Courland was administered as Liepāja County area (Kreisgebiet Libau).

In 1944 the Red Army lifted the siege of Leningrad and re-conquered the Baltic countries along with much of Ukraine and Belarus. However, some 200,000 German troops held out in Courland. With their backs to the Baltic Sea, they remained trapped in what became known as the Courland Pocket, blockaded by the Red Army and by the Red Baltic Fleet. Colonel-General Heinz Guderian, the Chief of the German General Staff, pleaded with Adolf Hitler to allow evacuation of the troops in Courland by sea for use in the defense of Germany. Hitler refused and ordered the Wehrmacht, Waffen-SS, Luftwaffe and Kriegsmarine forces in Courland to continue the defense of the area. Germany’s naval capacity to evacuate these forces was restricted as it needed the majority of its transport ships to evacuate troops from East Prussia and maintain vital trade with Sweden. On January 15, 1945, Army Group Courland (Heeresgruppe Kurland) formed under Colonel-General Dr. Lothar Rendulic. The blockade by elements of the Leningrad Front remained until May 8, 1945, when Army Group Courland, then under its last commander, Colonel-General Carl Hilpert, surrendered to Marshal Leonid Govorov, the commander of the Leningrad Front (reinforced by elements of the 2nd Baltic Front) on the Courland perimeter. At this time the group consisted of the remnants of some 31 divisions. After May 9, 1945, approximately 203,000 troops of Army Group Courland began to be moved to Soviet prison camps to the east. The majority of them never returned to Germany (Haupt, 1997).

Courland remained part of the Latvian SSR within the Soviet Union following World War II. Courland was no longer an administrative unit under the Soviets. Liepājas apgabals (1952-1953), one of three oblasts in Latvia, roughly corresponded to Courland.

With the dissolution of the Soviet Union, Courland became part of independent Latvia once more and it remains so to this day. Although Courland is not an administrative entity today, the Courland (Kurzeme) Planning Region, with an area of 13,596 square kilometres (5,249 sq mi) and a population of 301,621 in 2008, includes much of the traditional region. The remainder of Courland is part of the planning regions of Riga and Semigallia (Zemgale).

== Notable residents ==
- Ephraim Deinard (1846–1930), born in Valdemārpils, publisher and author.
- Reuven Dov Dessler (1863–1935), born in Grobiņa, rabbi and educator
- George Henry Loskiel (1740–1814), born in Angermuende in Courland, Moravian clergyman who obtained complete separation of the European and American branches of the church.
- Otto Mears, (1840–1931), pioneering road and railway builder in Colorado, United States; born in Courland.
- Dorothea von Medem (1761–1821), Duchess of Courland, wife of the last Duke of Courland
- Elisa von der Recke (1754–1833), writer and poet

== Sources ==
- This article incorporates text from a publication now in the public domain: Chisholm, Hugh, ed. (1911). "Courland". Encyclopædia Britannica. Vol. 7 (11th ed.). Cambridge University Press. p. 320.
- Christiansen, Eric, The Northern Crusades – the Baltic & the Catholic Frontier 1100–1525, London, 1980, ISBN 0-333-26243-3
- Haupt, Werner, Army Group North: The Wehrmacht in Russia 1941–1945, Schiffer Publishing, Atglen, PA., 1997. ISBN 0-7643-0182-9
- Hiden, John, The Baltic States and Weimar Ostpolitik, Cambridge University Press, 1987, ISBN 0-521-32037-2
- Hiden, John W., & Patrick Salmon, The Baltic Nations & Europe, Longman, London, 1991, ISBN 0-582-08246-3
- Hollmann, H, Kurlands Agrarverhältnisse, Riga, 1893.
- Kauffmann, Jean-Paul, A Journey to Nowhere: Detours and Riddles in the Lands and History of Courland, MacLehose Press, 2012
- Kirby, David, Northern Europe in the Early Modern Period – The Baltic World 1492 -1772, Longman, London, 1990, ISBN 0-582-00410-1
- Murray, John, Russia, Poland, and Finland, – Handbook for Travellers, 3rd revised edition, London, 1875. (Includes Kurland).
- O'Connor, Kevin (2003). The History of the Baltic States. Westport: Greenwood Press.
- Rauch, Georg (1974). The Baltic States: The Years of Independence: Estonia, Latvia, Lithuania, 1917-1940. London: Hurst.
- Stone, Norman (1998) [1975]. The Eastern Front, 1914–1917. New York: Penguin Books.
- Seraphim, E, Geschichte Liv-, Esth-, und Kurlands, Reval, 1895–1896 (2 vols).
- Sukiennicki, Wiktor (1984). East Central Europe During World War I: From Foreign Domination to National Independence. Boulder: East European Monographs.
