= Coat of arms of Courland =

Coat of arms of Courland, Latvia

Coat of Arms of Courland
- Adopted: 1930 (current version)
- Shield: Argent a lion rampant contourné Gules
- Earlier version(s): Coat of arms of the Duchy of Courland and Semigallia

The coat of arms of Courland (Kurzeme), a historical region in western Latvia, has been known since the 16th century and depicts a lion gules on a silver background.

== History ==
=== Duchy of Courland and Semigallia ===
Since 1565, the coat of arms of the Duchy of Courland and Semigallia was combined of four parts and included the coat of arms of Semigallia, an elk on blue field.

After the Duchy of Courland and Semigallia became a vassal state of the Polish–Lithuanian Commonwealth, a shield with the combined symbols of the ruling House of Kettler and of Polish-Lithuanian kings Stephen Báthory, Sigismund II Augustus and others was placed in the centre of the coat of arms. After the Kettler dynasty was replaced by the House of Biron, the small shield was changed, adapting symbols from their heraldry.

=== Russian Empire ===
In 1795, Courland and Semigallia became part of the Russian Empire as the Courland Governorate. On 6 December 1856, the governorate was officially granted a coat of arms which was based on the historical coat of arms of the duchy. A variant of the coat of arms was also adopted by the Couronian Knighthood, but has a shield with a cross pattée and a Paschal lamb in the centre. This design was also used in March–November 1918, when the German client state of the Duchy of Courland and Semigallia was proclaimed by the German occupational forces in the region during the final months of World War I.

=== Independent Latvia ===
After the independence of the Republic of Latvia, the symbol of Courland became part of the newly created Coat of arms of Latvia. The red lion representing Courland became an element of the shield and one of the supporters. The coat of arms was in official usage in Latvia until the Soviet occupation of Latvia in 1940. In 1990, shortly before the restoration of independence, the coat of arms was restored.

The official current version of the coat of arms of Courland as a historical and cultural region of Latvia was introduced in 1930, and re-confirmed again in 2012. While Courland is not a separate administrative unit within Latvia, it is designated by law as one of the Historical Latvian Lands.

The coat of arms of Kurzeme is also used by the Kurzeme Planning Region.

== Gallery ==
Coat of arms of the Duchy of Courland and Semigallia

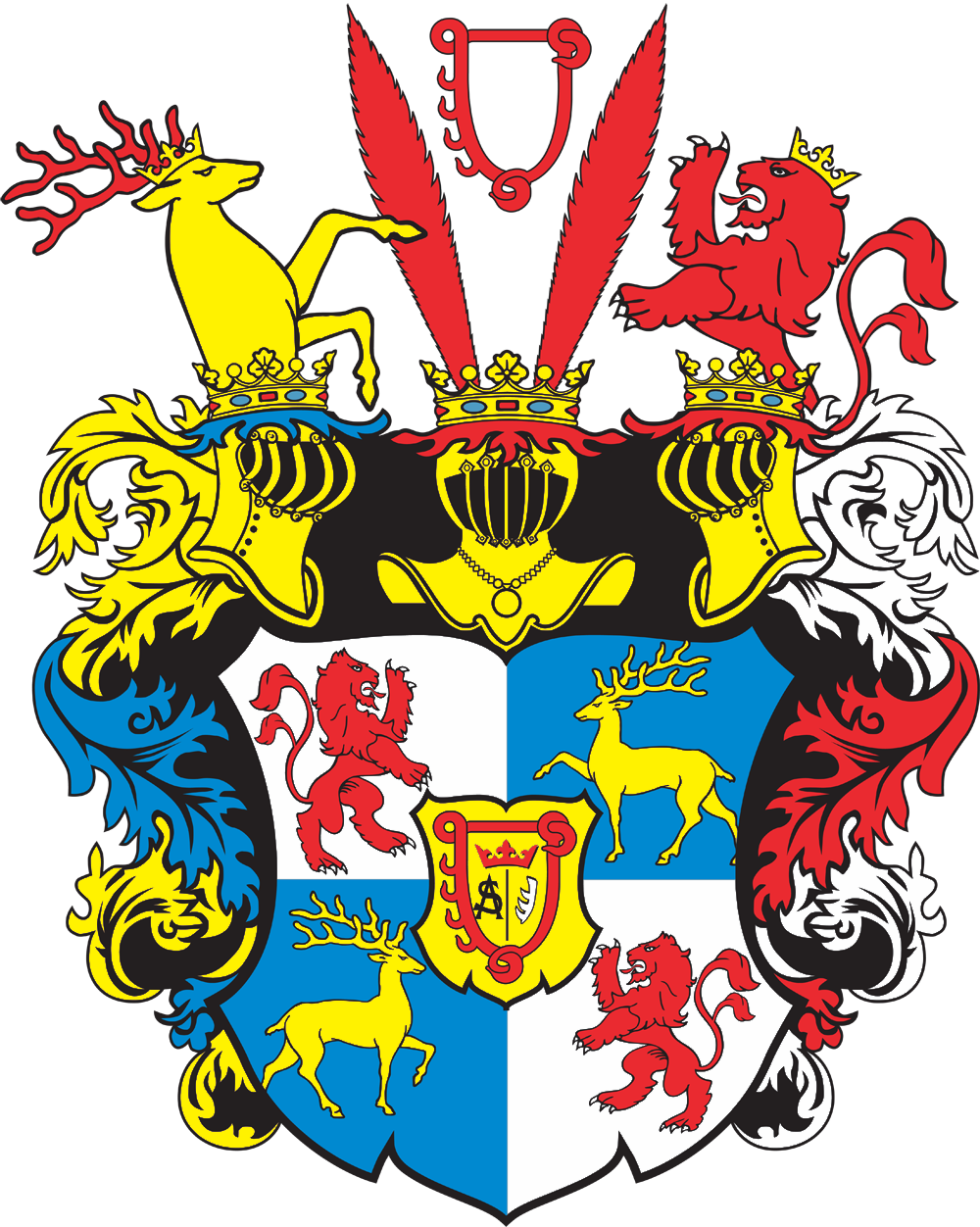
Coat of arms of the dukes of Courland and Semigallia, with the combined symbols of the House of Kettler and the Polish-Lithuanian kings in the middle

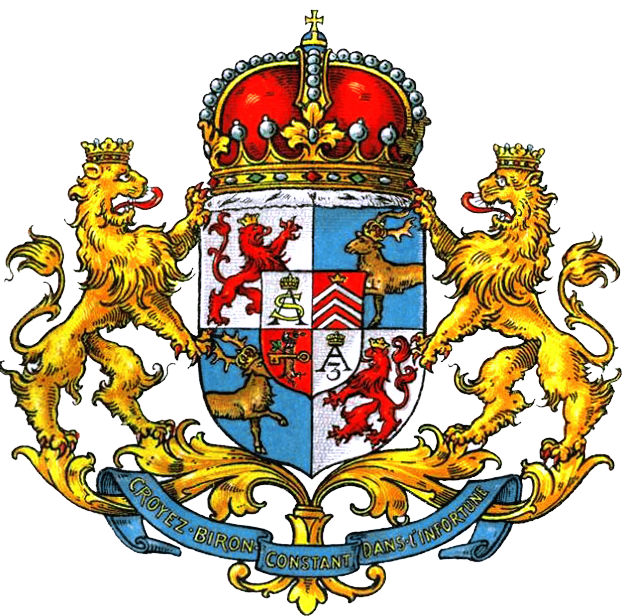
Coat of arms of the dukes of Courland and Semigallia, with the combined symbols of the House of Biron and the Polish-Lithuanian kings in the middle

Coat of arms of Courland Governorate of the Russian Empire (1856–1918)

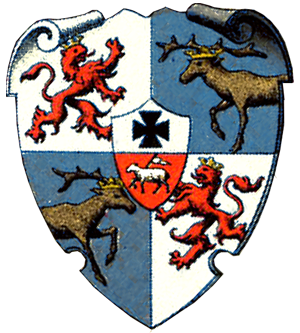
Coat of arms of Couronian Knighthood as documented in Baltisches Wappenbuch

The coat of arms of the short-lived Duchy, proclaimed by German forces in 1918

Coat of arms of Latvia (established 15 July 1921) with Courland represented by the red lion in the shield and as one of the supporters

== See also ==
- Coat of arms of Livonia
