= Coat of arms of Vidzeme =

Coat of Arms of Vidzeme
- Armiger: Vidzeme
- Adopted: 1930 (current version)
- Shield: Gules, a griffin coward Argent, in his dexter hand a sword colored the same.
- Earlier version: Coat of arms of the Governorate of Livonia

The coat of arms of Vidzeme, a region in central Latvia, depicts a white griffin in a red field. It is a version of the earlier coat of arms of Livonia granted in the 16th century.

== History ==
The coat of arms was granted to the Duchy of Livonia on 26 December 1566 by king Sigismund II Augustus of the Polish–Lithuanian Commonwealth.

The first version of the coat of arms included the king's initials S.A. on the griffin.

Without the king's initials, the coat of arms was also used in Swedish Livonia the part of the region that came under the control of the Swedish Empire in the 1620s. Since 1677, the coat of arms of Polish Livonia (the Inflanty Voivodeship, roughly corresponding to today's Latgale) included a ducal crown.

After the incorporation of Estonia and Livonia into the Russian Empire in 1710, the Russian Governorate of Riga and later the Governorate of Livonia have been granted coats of arms basing on the historical coat of arms of Livonia but included the tsar's initials ПВИВ on the griffin. The greater coat of arms of the Russian Empire also adopted the historical coat of arms of Livonia.

After the establishment of the independent Latvian state, the symbol of Livonia, representing the Latvian regions Vidzeme and Latgalia, became part of the newly created Coat of arms of Latvia. The white griffin representing Livonia became an element of the shield and one of the supporters. The coat of arms was in official usage in Latvia until the Soviet occupation of Latvia in 1940. In 1990, shortly before the restoration of independence, the coat of arms was restored.

The official current version of the coat of arms of Vidzeme as a historical and cultural region of Latvia was introduced in 1930, and confirmed again in 2012.

== Gallery ==
Coat of arms of the Duchy of Livonia (1566)

Coat of arms of the Kingdom of Livonia (1570)

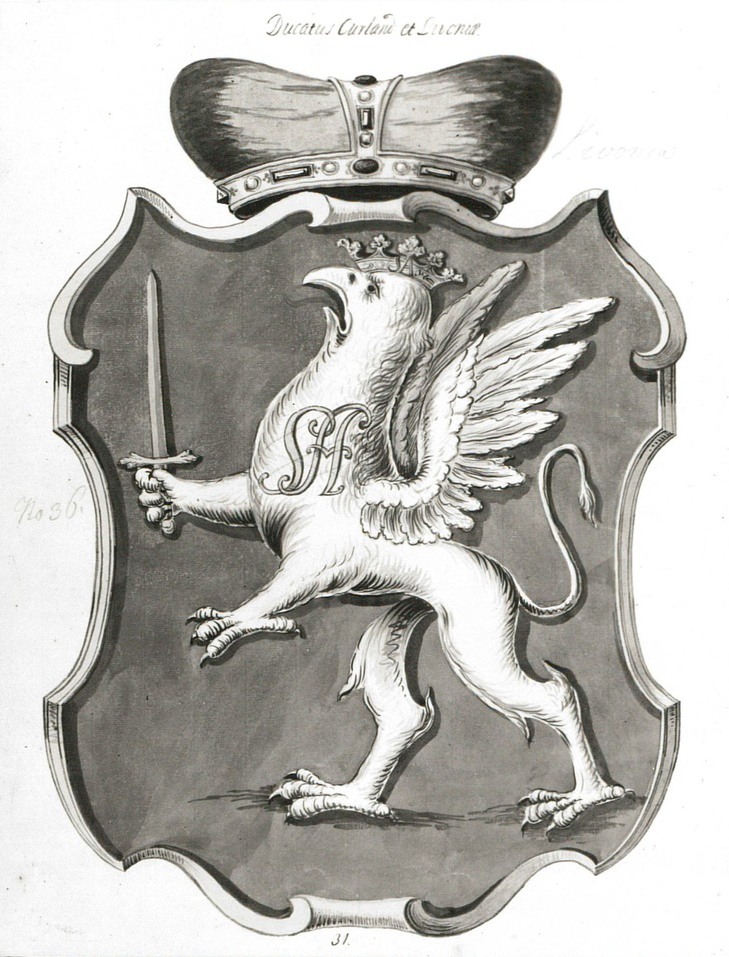
Coat of arms of the Polish Livonia (1720)

Coat of arms of Swedish Livonia (1660)

Coat of arms of Swedish Livonia (18th century)

Coat of arms of the Governorate of Livonia (1856–1918)

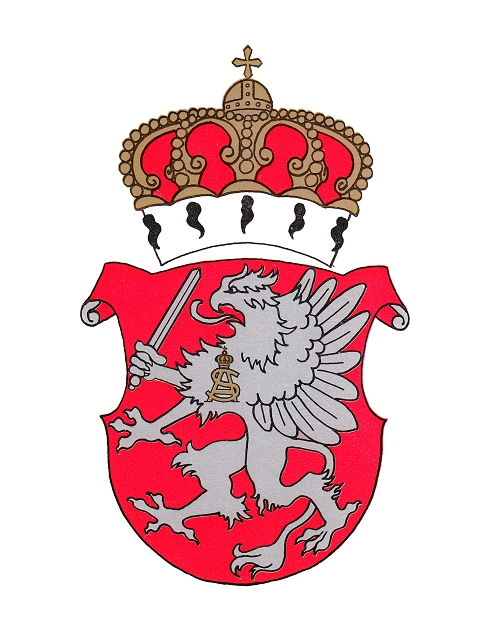
Coat of arms of the Livonian Knighthood

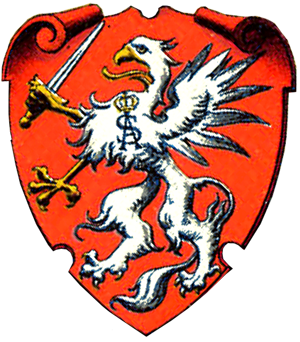
Version from Baltisches Wappenbuch

Coat of arms of Latvia (established 15 July 1921) with Livonia (Vidzeme and Latgalia) represented by the white griffin in the shield and as one of the supporters

== See also ==
- Coat of arms of Courland
