= Duchy of Livonia =

Vassal state of Lithuania (1561–1629) and Poland-Lithuania (1629-1721)

Duchy of Livonia Herzogtum Livland (German) Uždauguvio kunigaikštystė (Lithuanian) Księstwo Zadźwińskie (Polish) Ducatus Ultradunensis (Latin)
- 1561–1629
- Coat of arms

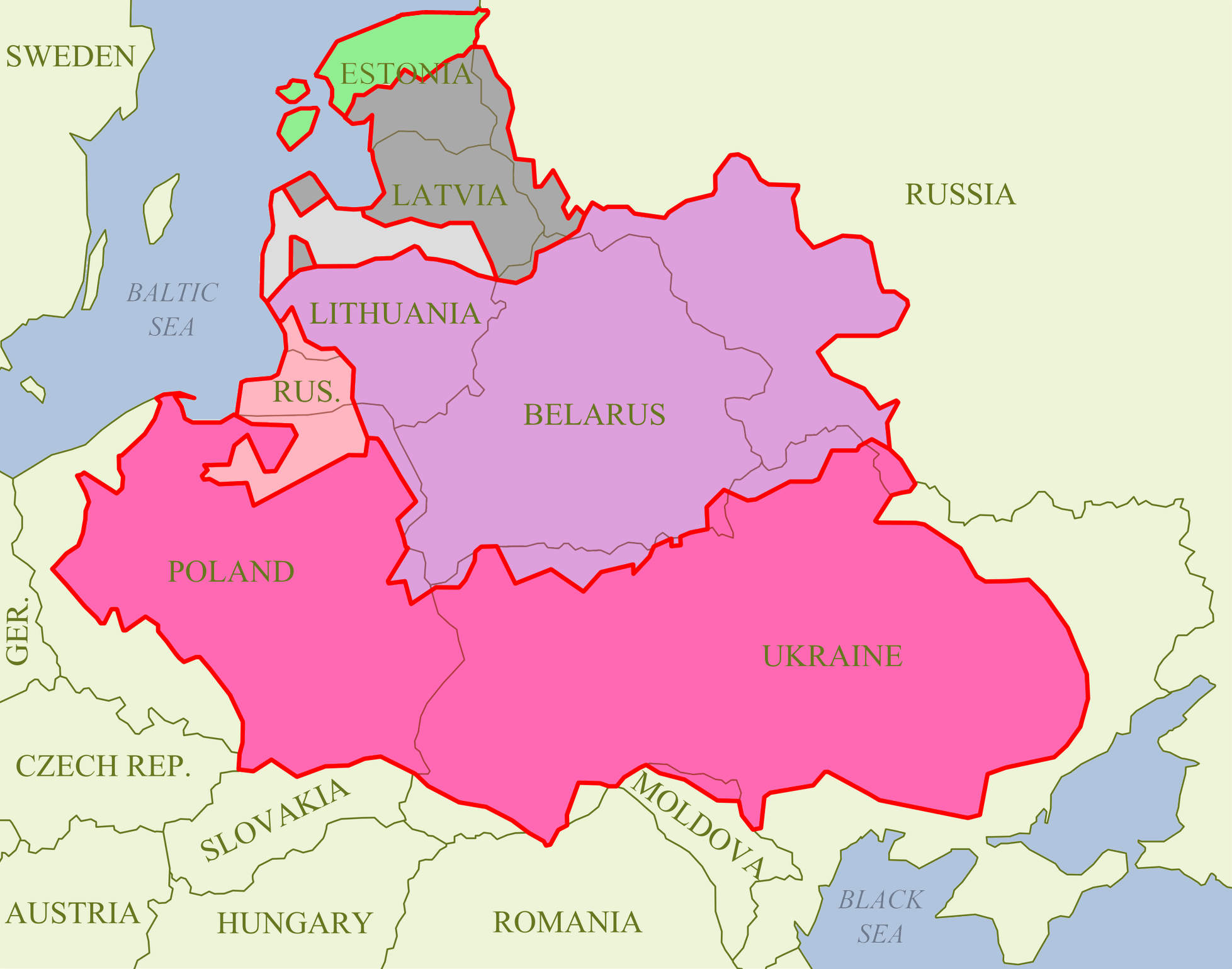
- Polish–Lithuanian Commonwealth with its major subdivisions after the 1618 Truce of Deulino, superimposed on present-day national borders. Livonia here is coloured dark grey, upper-right, over modern Estonia and Latvia. Swedish Estonia is coloured green.
- Capital: Fellin (Viljandi); 58°22′N 25°36′E
- Common languages: Official: German
- Religion: Lutheranism
- Government: Principality
- Grand Duke of Livonia
  - 1561–1572: Sigismund II Augustus
  - 1573–1575: Henry III de Valois
  - 1576–1586: Stephen Báthory and Anna Jagiellon
  - 1588–1621: Sigismund III Vasa
- Governor
  - 1566–1578: Jan Hieronimowicz Chodkiewicz
- Historical era: Early Modern Age
  - Treaty of Vilnius: 28 November 1561
  - Polish–Swedish War: 1620–1622
  - Truce of Altmark: 25 September 1629
Preceded by	Succeeded by
Terra Mariana; Free City of Riga	Swedish Livonia; Inflanty Voivodeship

The Duchy of Livonia, (Note: Polish: Księstwo Zadźwińskie or Księstwo Inflanckie; Lithuanian: Livonijos kunigaikštystė or Uždauguvio kunigaikštystė; Latin: Ducatus Ultradunensis; Estonian: Liivimaa hertsogkond; Latvian: Pārdaugavas hercogiste; German: Herzogtum Livland) also referred to as Polish Livonia or Livonia, (Note: Polish: Inflanty) was a semi-autonomous vassal state of the Grand Duchy of Lithuania and, from 1569, the Polish–Lithuanian Commonwealth. Established in 1561 following the dissolution of the Livonian Confederation during the Livonian War, it comprised most of present-day northern Latvia and southern Estonia. The duchy existed until 1629, when most of its territory passed to the Swedish Empire after the Polish–Swedish War (1600–1629).

The duchy was created under the terms of the Treaty of Vilnius (1561), by which the Livonian nobility accepted the suzerainty of the Grand Duke of Lithuania in return for guarantees of their traditional privileges. Although subject to the Commonwealth's monarch, Livonia retained its own provincial administration, legal institutions, and the dominant political influence of the Baltic German nobility. Lutheranism remained the principal confession despite the Catholic faith of the ruling dynasty.

== History ==
Livonia had been part of the Grand Duchy of Lithuania from 1561, since the Livonian Order was secularized by the Union of Vilnius and the Livonian Confederation dissolved during the Livonian Wars. Part of Livonia formed the Duchy of Courland and Semigallia while the south-west part of today's Estonia and north-east part of today's Latvia, covering what are now Vidzeme and Latgale, were ceded to the Grand Duchy of Lithuania.

In 1566, it was declared the Duchy of Livonia according to the Treaty of Union between the landowners of Livonia and authorities of Lithuania; Jan Hieronimowicz Chodkiewicz became the first Governor of the Duchy (1566–1578) in Sigulda Castle. It was a province of Grand Duchy of Lithuania until 1569. After the Union of Lublin in 1569, it became a joint domain of the Polish Crown and the Grand Duchy.

The larger part of the Duchy was conquered by Swedish Empire during the Polish–Swedish War (1621–1625), and their gains were recognized in the Truce of Altmark in 1629. The Commonwealth retained southeastern parts of the Wenden Voivodeship, renamed to Inflanty Voivodeship with the capital in Daugavpils (Dyneburg), until the first Partition of Poland in 1772, when it was annexed by Catherine the Great's Russian Empire. The title "Prince of Livonia" was added to the grand title of later Russian Emperors.

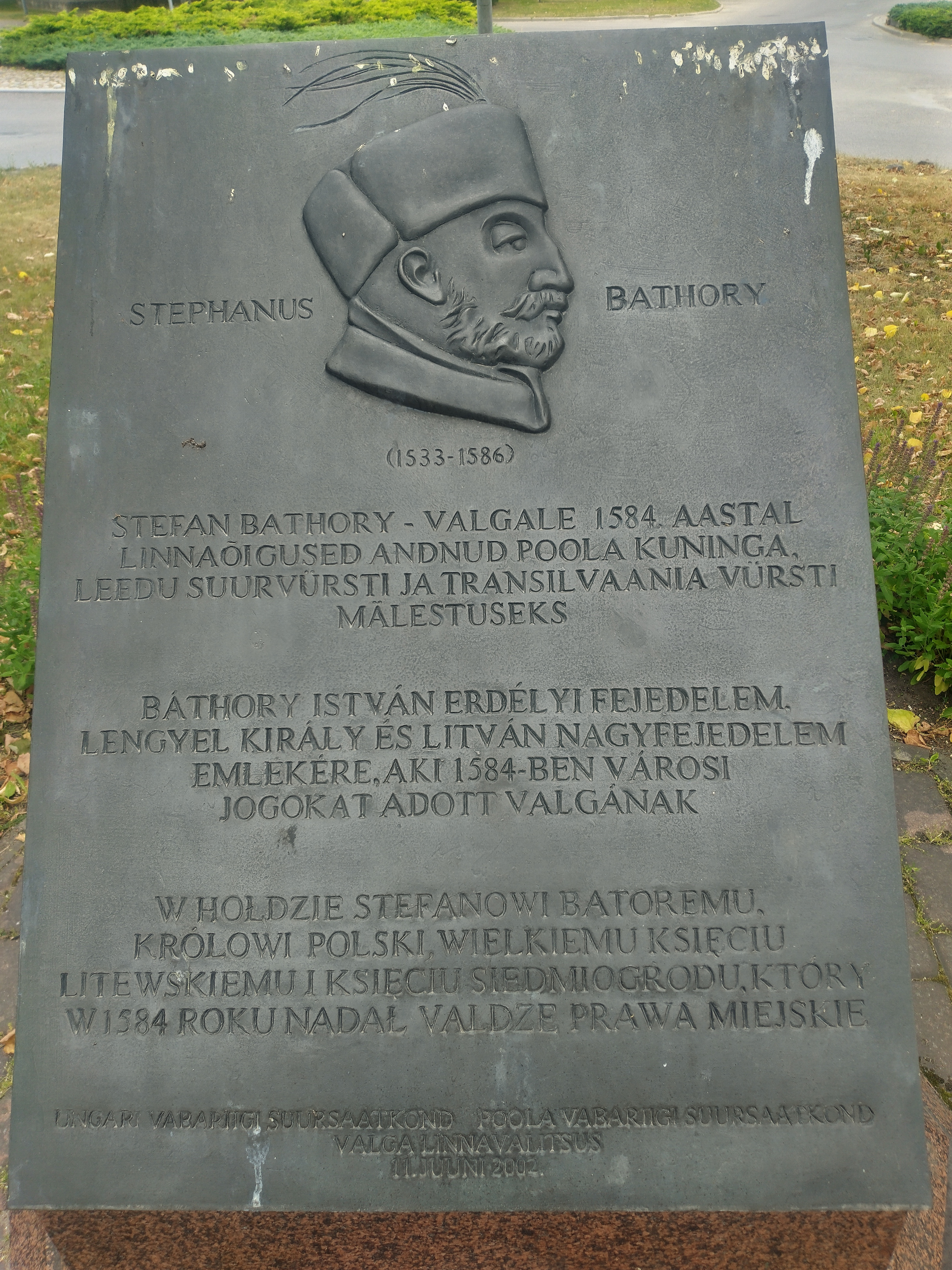
Monument in Valga, Estonia to king Stephen Báthory, who granted city rights to the city of Valga in 1584. Texts in Estonian, Hungarian and Polish.

== Administrative divisions ==
- Dorpat Voivodeship (Dorpat) from 1598 to the 1620s
- Parnawa Voivodeship (Parnawa) from 1598 to the 1620s
- Wenden Voivodeship (Wenden) from 1598 to the 1620s

== See also ==
- Inflanty Voivodeship from the 1620s to 1772
- Bishopric of Ösel-Wiek
