= Inflanty Voivodeship =

Administrative division in the Polish-Lithuanian Commonwealth

Coordinates: 55°52′23″N 26°31′01″E

Inflanty Voivodeship Livonian Voivodeship Województwo inflanckie
- Voivodeship of the Polish–Lithuanian Commonwealth
- 1621–1772
- Coat of arms

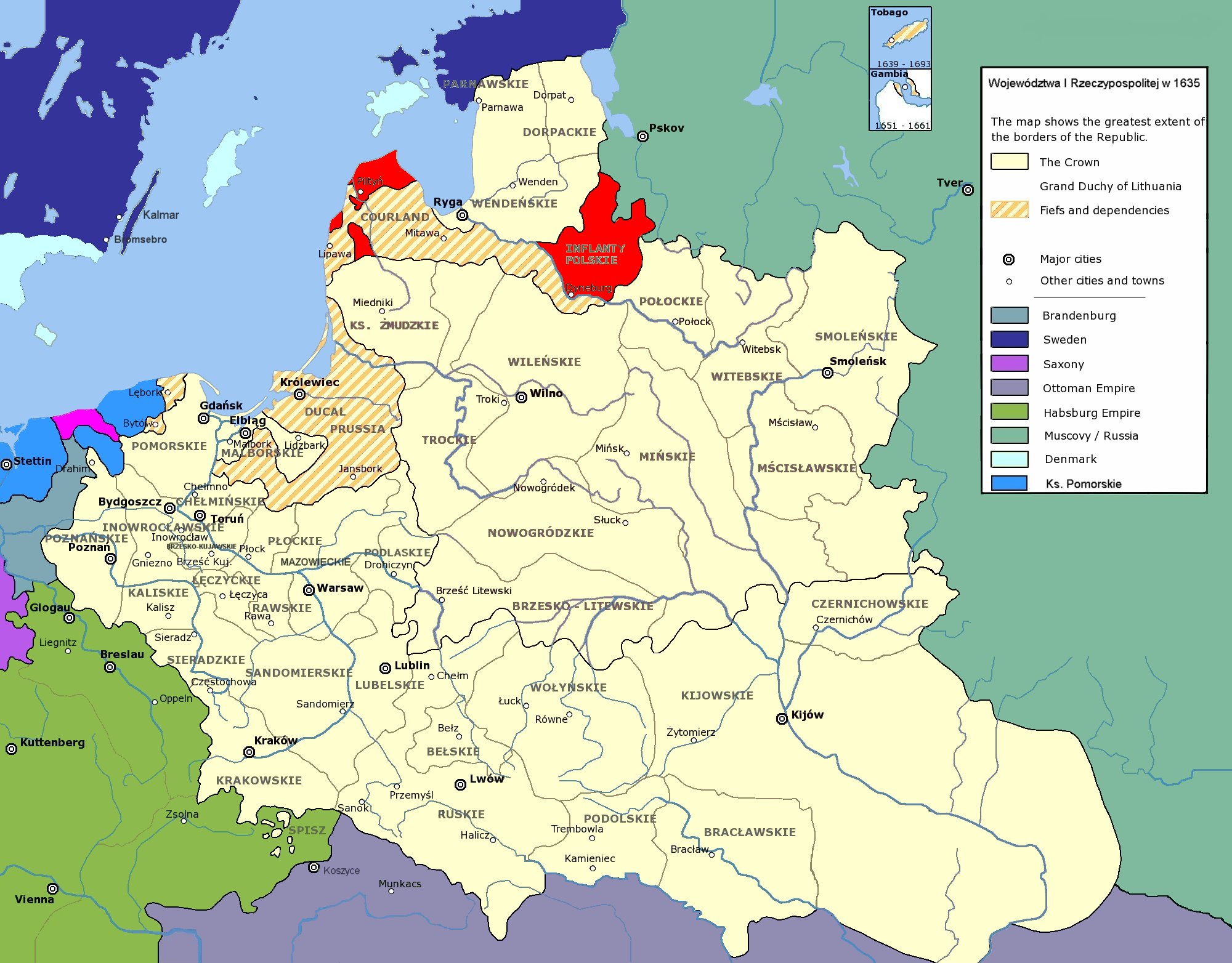
- Inflanty in the Polish–Lithuanian Commonwealth, 1635.
- Capital: Dyneburg
- Area
- 12,000 km^{2} (4,600 sq mi)
- History
  - Polish–Swedish War: 1621
  - Treaty of Oliva: 23 April 1660
  - First partition: 5 August 1772
Preceded by	Succeeded by
Duchy of Livonia	Vitebsk Governorate

The Inflanty Voivodeship (Polish: Województwo inflanckie), or Livonian Voivodeship (Lithuanian: Livonijos vaivadija), also known as Polish Livonia, was an administrative division and local government in the Polish–Lithuanian Commonwealth, since it was formed in the 1620s out of the Wenden Voivodeship and lasted until the First Partition of Poland in 1772. The Inflanty Voivodeship was one of the few territories of the Polish–Lithuanian Commonwealth to be ruled jointly by Poland and Lithuania.

== Overview ==
The Inflanty Voivodeship, also called the Duchy of Inflanty, due to a 1667 bill of the Sejm, was the minority remainder of the Duchy of Livonia, which had been conquered by the Swedish Empire during the Polish–Swedish War of 1621–1625. The seat of the voivode was Dyneburg (Daugavpils).

The name Inflanty is derived through Polonization of Livland, the German name for Livonia. In modern times the region is known as Latgalia in the Republic of Latvia.

Zygmunt Gloger in his monumental book Historical Geography of the Lands of Old Poland provides this description of Inflanty Voivodeship:

The land, called by the Poles Inflanty, in Latin Livonia, in German Liefland, and in Latvian Widzzemme, had the area of 1,092 sq. miles (...) It was inhabited by the Latvians, whose language is similar to Lithuanian, but still differs from it, as the Latvians interacted and mixed with the Estonians in central and northern Inflanty. The province, together with Courland, was in the 13th century conquered by the Germans of the Livonian Brothers of the Sword. Later on, however, facing three powerful neighbours: Muscovy, Swedish Empire, and the Polish–Lithuanian Commonwealth, the monks found it difficult to keep their independence. After Estonia had been seized by Sweden, Great Master Gotthard Kettler voluntarily decided to seek for help from Polish king. With permission of Livonian towns and knights, on 28 November 1561 in Vilnius, a document was signed, which turned Livonia into a Polish–Lithuanian fief (see Treaty of Vilnius (1561)). On December 26 of the same year, King Sigismund Augustus confirmed the Union of Grodno, which created a union between the Grand Duchy of Lithuania and the Duchy of Livonia (...)

The union resulted in a long and bloody struggle over Livonia, which at first was fought by the Polish–Lithuanian Commonwealth and Muscovy, later also by Sweden. Due to the military victories of King Stephen Báthory, the Commonwealth's control of Livonia was confirmed in 1582, when the province was divided into three presidencies, with capitals at Dorpat, Wenden and Parnawa (...) In 1598, King Sigismund III Vasa renamed the presidencies into voivodeships (...) Since Livonia was greatly desired by her neighbours, keeping control over it resulted in costly wars, which, despite efforts of Jan Zamoyski and Jan Karol Chodkiewicz, were a lost cause (...) The Treaty of Oliwa in 1660 returned to the Commonwealth only one-fifth of Livonia, which was named Inflanty Voivodeship (...) The Warsaw Sejm of 1677 settled the case of Inflanty, naming it a voivodeship and a duchy, with the right to name three senators: the Bishop, the Voivode and the Castellan of Inflanty (...) Since the Union of Lublin named Livonia a joint Polish–Lithuanian possession, all royal bills for the province were stamped with both Polish and Lithuanian stamps. The post-1660 Inflanty Voivodeship was divided into four so-called tracts, named after seats of starostas. These were Dyneburg, Rzezyca, Piltyn, Marienhaus, and Lucyn. Local sejmiks took place at Dyneburg, while starostas resided at Dyneburg, Lucyn, Rzezyca and Marienhaus. The voivodeship had six deputies to the Sejm, but only two of them came from Inflanty, the other four were symbolically named by the king, to remember the lost part of Livonia. Two deputies were elected to the treasury committee at Grodno (...)

Inflanty had several noble families. Some of them were descendants of German knights, such as the families of Borch, Plater, Hilzen, Zyberg, Weissenhof, Tyzenhaus, Grotus, Mohl, Denhof, Rejtan, Manteufel, others were Polish or Lithuanian settlers, such as the families of Szadurscy, Karniccy, Benislawscy, Sokolowscy, Kubliccy, Wereszczynscy (...)

== Voivodes ==
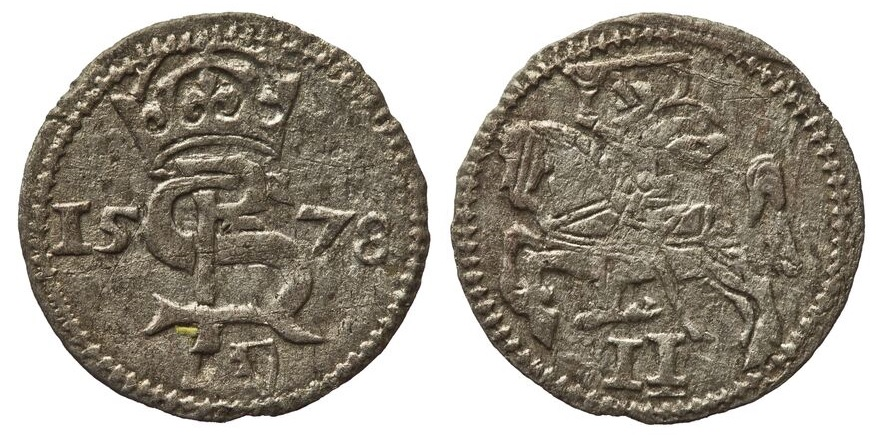
Lithuanian-Livonian double-Denar with monogram of Grand Duke Stephen Báthory, coat of arms of Gotthard Kettler and the coat of arms of Lithuania, minted in Mitau, 1578

This is a list of the voivodes for Inflanty:

- 1677–1695 Jan Teodor Schlieben
- 1695–1696 Jan Andrzej Plater
- 1696–1705 Otto Fryderyk Felkierzamb (von Voelkersamb)
- 1705–1707 Fabian Plater
- 1707–1712 Stefan Karol Grothus
- 1709–1713 Józef Kos
- 1713–1722 Piotr Jerzy Przebendowski
- 1722–1735 Antoni Andrzej Morsztyn
- 1735–1736 Jan Ludwik Plater
- 1737–1765 Franciszek Jakub Szembek
- 1765–1767 Jan Andrzej Borch
- 1767–1769 Stanisław Brzostowski
- 1769–1775 Jozafat Zyberk (Sieberg zu Wischiing)
- 1775–1778 Jan Tadeusz Zyberg (Sieberg zu Wischiing)
- 1778–1788 Kasper Rogaliński
- 1790–1794 Adam Ewald Felkerzamb (von Voelkersamb)

== Bibliography ==
- Mikulski, Krzysztof; Rachuba, Andrzej (1994). Urzędnicy inflanccy XVI-XVIII wieku. Spisy. Urzędnicy dawnej Rzeczypospolitej XII-XVIII wieku. Spisy. Vol. 9. Kórnik.
