= Treaty of Novgorod =

Treaty of Novgorod may refer to

- Treaty of Novgorod (1326)
- Treaty of Novgorod (1537)
- Treaty of Novgorod (1557)
- Treaty of Novgorod (1561)
