= Treaty of Novgorod (1561) =

1561 treaty between Russia and Sweden

The Treaty of Novgorod was concluded in August 1561, during the Livonian War, between Sweden and the Tsardom of Russia. It settled the common border, with Reval (Tallinn) submitted to Swedish rule since June, revised the truce established in the Treaty of Novgorod (1557) and renewed in early 1561 to last twenty years. The treaty was renewed and extended by the Treaty of Dorpat (1564).

== Sources ==
- De Madariaga, Isabel (2006). Ivan the Terrible. Yale University Press. p. 191. ISBN 0-300-11973-9.
