= Battles of Wenden (1577–1578) =

Battles fought during the Livonian War

Battle of Wenden (1577–1578)
- Part of the Livonian War
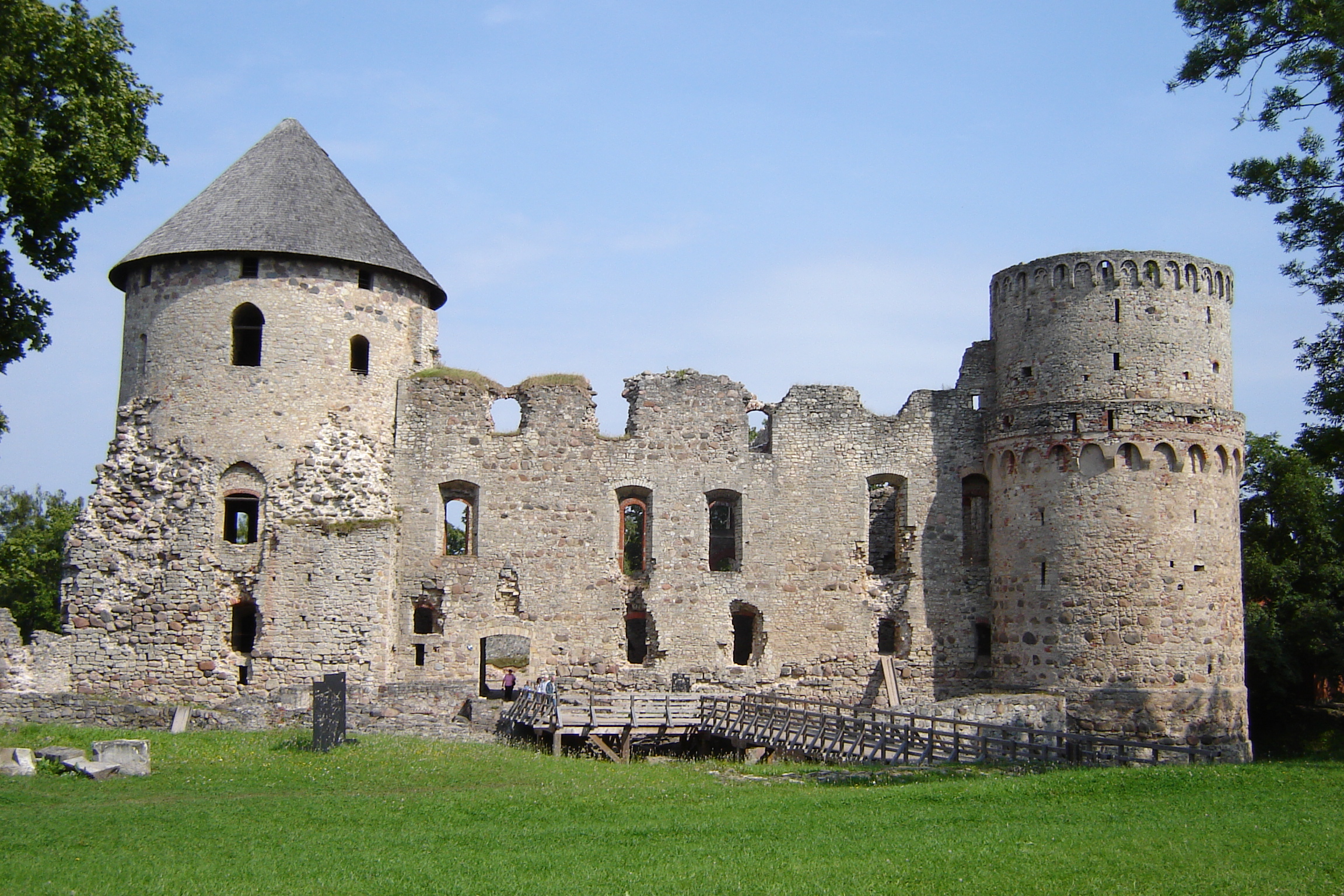
- Cēsis (Wenden) Castle today
| Date | Aug–Sept 1577: successful Russian siege; Jan 1578: Polish–Swedish capture; Feb 1578: failed Russian recapture; Sept–Oct 1578: failed Russian siege; 21 Oct 1578: Polish–Swedish battlefield victory |
| Location | Cēsis, Latvia 57°18′50″N 25°16′8″E |
| Result | Swedish–Polish victory |

Belligerents
| Poland–Lithuania; Sweden (1578) | (Tsardom of Russia) Russia Magnus of Livonia (August 1577) |

Commanders and leaders
| Andrzej Sapieha, Göran Boije | Ivan Galitzin |

Strength
| 4,000–6,000 | 18,000–22,000 (Livonian claim) |

Casualties and losses
| About 400 men | 6,280 killed (inflated Livonian claim); 3,000 captured 1,720 dispersed 20–30 artillery pieces At least 162 mentioned in a 17th-century Russian sinodik |

The Battles of Wenden were a series of battles for control of the stronghold of Wenden (Cēsis, Kiesia, Võnnu), in present-day Latvia, fought during the Livonian War in 1577 and 1578. Magnus of Livonia besieged the town in August 1577, but was deposed and replaced by Russian forces under Tsar Ivan IV, who eventually sacked the town and castle in what became a symbolic victory. Polish forces, however, re-captured the stronghold in November and beat back a Russian counter-attack in February 1578.

In October 1578, the Russian army again laid siege to the town, but was destroyed by a smaller Swedish–German–Polish relief force. This marked the turning point in the Livonian War, shifting the initiative from the Tsardom of Russia to Sweden and the Polish–Lithuanian Commonwealth. It also marked the end of the Kingdom of Livonia, which collapsed when Magnus retired to Courland.

== Background ==
In 1570 and 1571, Ivan IV "the Terrible" of Russia faced internal disputes, culminating in the slaughter of Novgorod's inhabitants and the burning of Moscow by the Crimean tartars. Yet, he was able to recover and resume his campaigns in the Livonian War in 1572. A Swedish counter-offensive in 1574 failed. Ivan IV had introduced a new strategy, relying on tens of thousands of his troops, Cossacks, and tartars to achieve superiority over his adversaries. Unlike the latter, he used a large number of native troops instead of a few thousand professional mercenaries. Swedish forces were besieged in Reval (Tallinn), Danish Estonia was raided, and so was central Livonia as far as Dünaburg (Daugavpils), since 1561 formally under Polish-Lithuanian suzerainty. The conquered territories submitted to Ivan or his vassal, Duke Magnus of the House of Oldenburg, who was declared as king of Livonia in 1570.

The year 1576 marked the height of Ivan's campaign, and another 30,000 Russian forces crossed into Livonia in 1577. Magnus had fallen into disgrace when he defected from Ivan IV during the same year, and started to subordinate castles without consulting the tsar. When Kokenhusen (Koknese) submitted to Magnus in the hope of avoiding Ivan IV's army, the tsar sacked it and executed its German commanders. The campaign then focussed on Wenden (Cēsis, Võnnu), "the heart of Livonia", which as the former capital of the Livonian Order was not only of strategic importance but also a symbol for Livonia itself.

=== 1577 ===
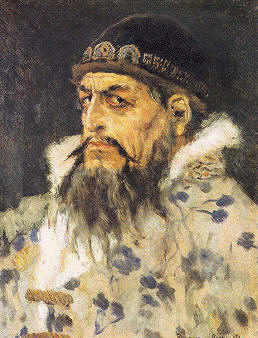
Ivan IV of Russia

In the summer of 1577, Magnus of Livonia laid siege to Wenden. The Russian army under Ivan IV appeared before Wenden's walls in late August. Ivan had Magnus arrested, sacked the town, and laid siege to the castle. The last 300 defenders, men, women, and children retreated to the castle's main tower and either died in an accidental explosion of gunpowder stored in the tower or committed collective suicide by blowing themselves up with 4 pounds (1.8 kg) of gunpowder, probably because the garrison had been "promised a terrible fate" by the tsar in response to them having fired at him with cannons. (Note: Allegedly responsible for the blast was the Livonian noble Hinrik (Heinrich) Boismann.Derrik, Torsten (2000). Das Bruderbuch der Revaler Tafelgilde (1364–1549) (in German). Marburg: Tectum. p. 56.) Thus, Wenden fell to Ivan in September, and was made a seat of four newly appointed voivodes who were to administer the province for Russia.

The sack of Wenden was a huge symbolic victory for Ivan. Among his opponents in the Livonian War, John III of Sweden only controlled Reval (Tallinn), Stephen Báthory of Poland only held Riga, Frederick II of Denmark was limited to the island of Øsel (Ösel, Saaremaa), Magnus of Livonia, though released by Ivan, abdicated in 1578 and withdrew to Piltene in Courland. Ivan's control of nearly all of Livonia and Estonia was secured by garrisons numbering 22,000 men in total.

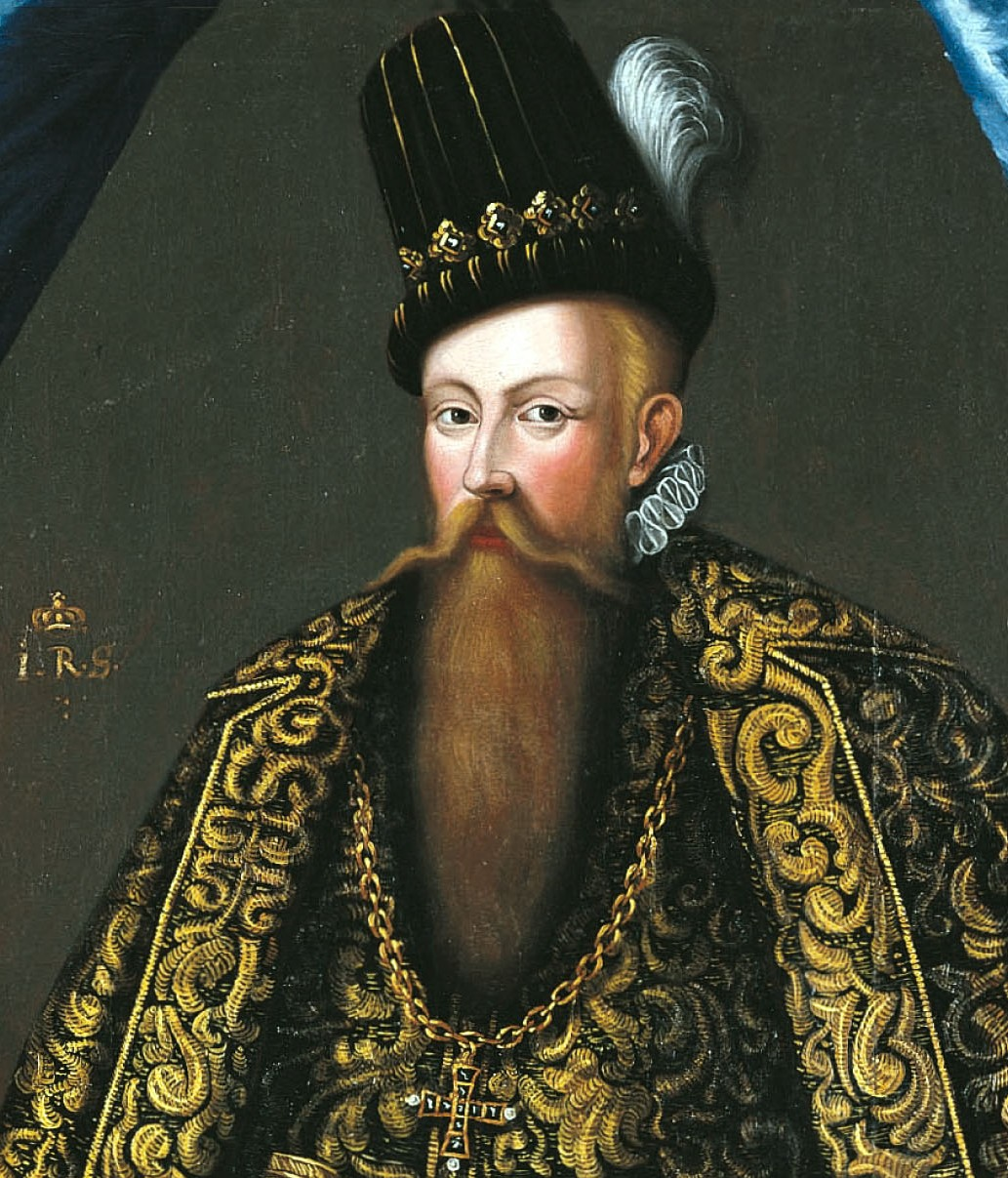
John III of Sweden

=== 1578 ===
John III and Stephen Báthory formed an alliance against Ivan IV in December 1577, after Báthory had concluded the Danzig War. Already in November, Lithuanian forces had started an offensive from the south and captured Dünaburg (Daugavpils). A Polish–Swedish force took the town and castle of Wenden in early 1578. Russian forces tried to re-take the town in February, but failed.

A subsequent Swedish offensive, targeted Leal (Lihula), Lode (Koluvere), Hapsal (Haapsalu), Pernau (Pärnu), Dorpat (Tartu), and Novgorod. In September, Ivan responded by sending in an army, which the Livonian Chronicle claimed to be 18,000 strong, who re-captured Oberpahlen (Põltsamaa) from Sweden and then marched on Wenden.

== Battle ==
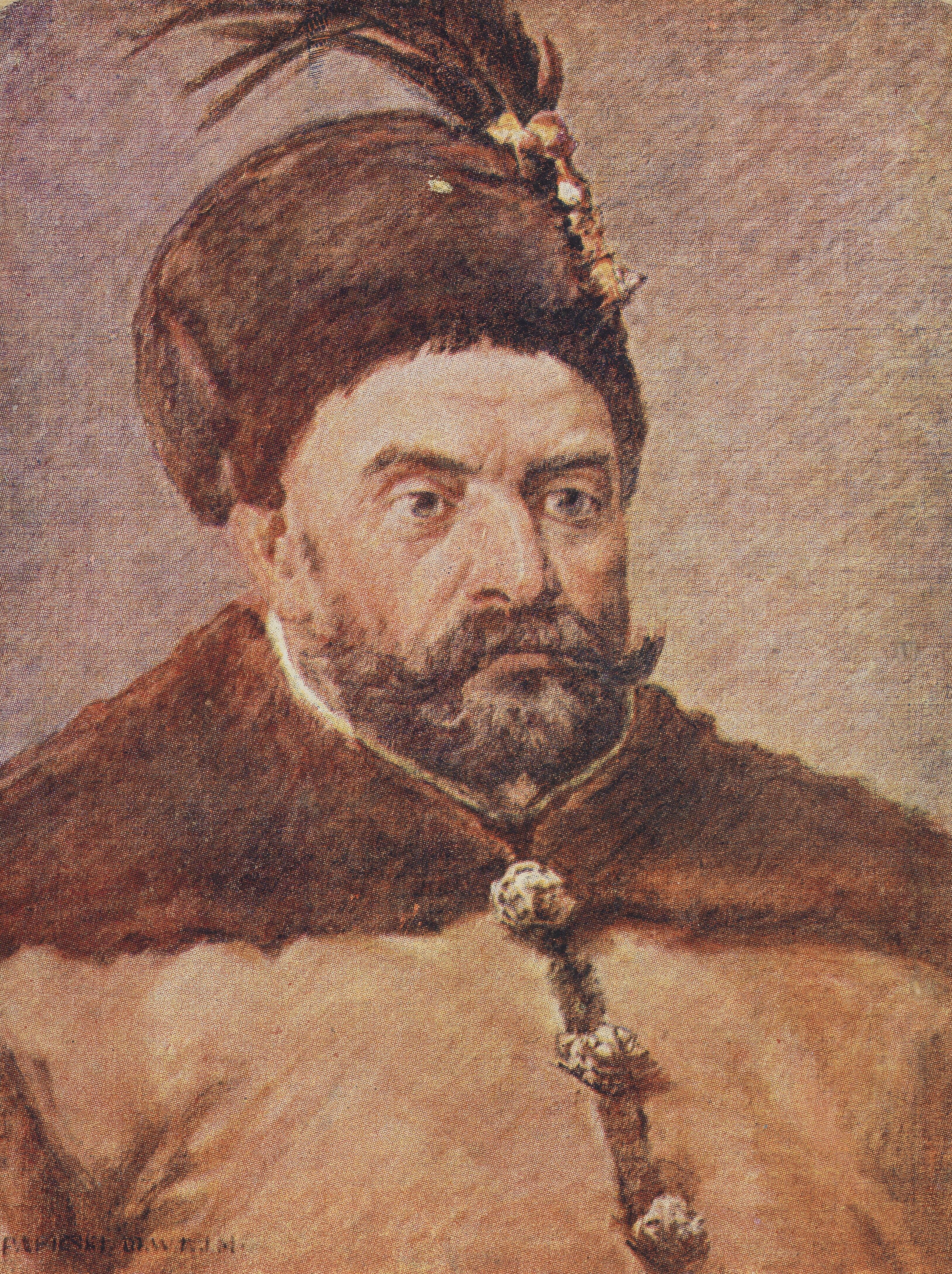
Stephen Báthory of Poland

Upon their arrival at Wenden, the Russian army laid siege to the town. Soon the Russian artillery breached the wall, but then an allied relief force consisting of 5,500 to 6,000 German, Lithuanian, Polish, Transylvanian, Bohemian, Romanian, and Swedish soldiers confronted the Russians on 21 October. The right flank (around 2,000 cavalry) was commanded by Andrzej Sapieha, while the left flank consisted of Swedish forces (2,000 infantry) commanded by Göran Boye.

First, the Russian cavalry was defeated and driven off in open field, with the Tatar cavalrymen being the first to retreat, then the Russian infantry, still entrenched for the siege, was defeated or taken prisoner. Russian casualties were substantial, and among the captives, there were several high-ranking boyars. Livonian reports of the Russian casualties were inflated, with the official proclamation "Moscouische Niderlag, und Belegerung der Statt Wenden" (Nürnberg, 1579) and the Livonian Chronicle of Balthasar Russow claiming that the Russians lost 6,000 men. Reinhold Heidenstein, a Polish diplomat, described their casualties as severe, without specifying the number of losses. A 17th-century Russian sinodik, that is, a book of the deceased to be prayed for, mentions the names of 162 men killed in the battle, but the list doesn't include a large part of the army. Some 30 siege guns and large numbers of horses (Note: "A thousand" according to Frost, "thousands" according to Peterson.) were captured, enabling the whole Swedish infantry to ride back to Reval. The captured cannons were taken by the Lithuanians and paraded through Vilnius, contrary to the Swedish wishes and the agreements between the allies prior to the battle.

The battle was unusual insofar as only a few battles of the Livonian War were fought in the open field; usually, one of the parties took a defensive position in a fortress, while the opposing party laid siege. Furthermore, Wenden was to remain the only occasion of a Swedish–Polish–Lithuanian collaboration in battle, as the alliance fell apart in the following years.

The allied victory marked the turning point of the Livonian War Ivan IV was for the first time seriously defeated in Livonia. A series of further Russian defeats followed and paved the way for the Swedish storming of Narva in September 1581, which resulted in a massacre of 6,000 of its citizens, forcing Ivan to accept an unfavourable outcome of the war in the Truce of Jam Zapolski with Stephen Bathory and the Treaty of Plussa with John III.

== Sources ==
=== Bibliography ===
- Hedberg, Jonas (1975). Kungl. Artilleriet – Medeltid och äldre vasatid. Stockholm: Militärhistoriska förlaget. ISBN 91-85266-03-5.
- Angermann, Norbert (1972). Studien zur Livlandpolitik Ivan Groznyjs. Marburger Ostforschungen (in German). Vol. 32. Hamburg. ISBN 3-87969-098-7.
- Frost, Robert I (2000). The Northern Wars. War, State and Society in Northeastern Europe 1558-1721. Longman. pp. 27–28. ISBN 978-0-582-06429-4.
- Oakley, Steward (1992). War and peace in the Baltic, 1560-1790. War in Context. Abingdon - New York: Routledge. p. 37. ISBN 0-415-02472-2.
- Peterson, Gary Dean (2007). Warrior kings of Sweden. The rise of an empire in the sixteenth and seventeenth centuries. McFarland. pp. 94–95. ISBN 978-0-7864-2873-1.
- Roberts, Michael (1986). The early Vasas. A history of Sweden 1523-1611. CUP Archive. ISBN 0-521-31182-9.
