= Treaty of Vilnius =

Treaty of Vilnius may refer to

- Pact of Vilnius and Radom (1401)
- Union of Kraków and Vilna (1499)
- Treaty of Vilnius (1559), during the Livonian War
- Treaty of Vilnius (1561), during the Livonian War
- Truce of Vilna (1656), during the Russo-Polish War (1654–1667) and the Second Northern War (1655–1660)
