= Treaty of Novgorod (1557) =

1557 peace treaty ending the Russo-Swedish War

The Treaty, Truce or Second Peace of Novgorod was concluded in March 1557. It ended the Russo-Swedish War (1554–1557), a series of skirmishes in the Viborg and Oreshek areas resulting from Swedish attempts to keep Livonia, where the Teutonic Order's rule had collapsed, out of the Russian sphere of influence.

== Negotiations and ratification ==
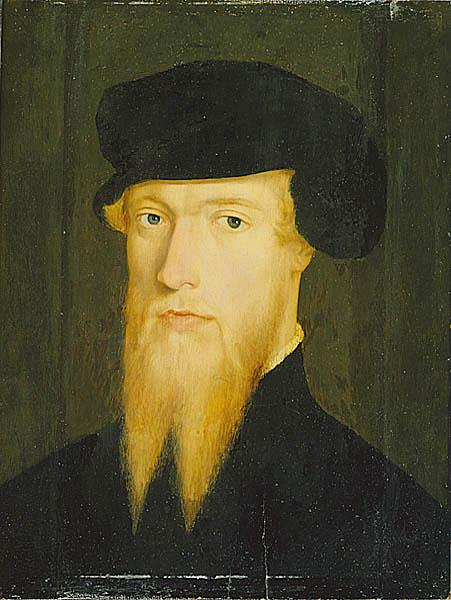
Eric XIV of Sweden

Since 1554, Gustav I of Sweden had attempted to draw the Livonian gentry into an alliance with Sweden, Denmark-Norway and Poland-Lithuania. After his failure, Gustav I started negotiations for a Russo-Swedish peace with Novgorod's governor, Prince Mikhail Vasil'evich Glinsky. Novgorod was the traditional Russo-Swedish contact point, and Russian tsar Ivan IV "the Terrible" refused to negotiate with Sweden directly since he regarded the elected Gustav I to be of lower status than a hereditary tsar as himself. Gustav I, on the other hand, did not recognise the Russian tsar as an emperor. He also questioned whether the "Duchy of Muscovy" could represent Russia. Therefore, he wanted to send the Swedish commander of Viborg Castle as negotiator.

In the end, Ivan IV claimed that he made an exception and allowed a Swedish delegation, led by Sten Eriksson Leijonhufvud, Gustav I's brother-in-law and Laurentius Petri, Archbishop of Uppsala, to leave Novgorod for an audience in Moscow, where they met him in person. The Swedish delegation had 100 men. The delegates had entered Russia after Åbo clergyman Knut Johanneson had acquired the necessary permit in Moscow in 1556. The delegates had arrived in Moscow on 24 February 1557, but the conclusion of the treaty was delayed until the end of March by the fasting period.

The treaty was then signed between Novgorod and Sweden and introduced a Russo-Swedish truce, which was set to expire in forty years. Sweden agreed to not support Livonia or Poland-Lithuania in a war between them and Russia. In addition, Swedish envoys were again barred from ever meeting the Russian tsar and referred to Novgorod for further contacts.

On 2 April, in Novgorod, the treaty was put into effect by kissing the cross, following Russian tradition, as demanded by Ivan IV. Michael Agricola, who translated the New Testament into Finnish and is regarded "father of the Finnish written language", was also part of the delegation. He died of illness on their way back in Uusikirkko (now Polyane).

== Consequences ==
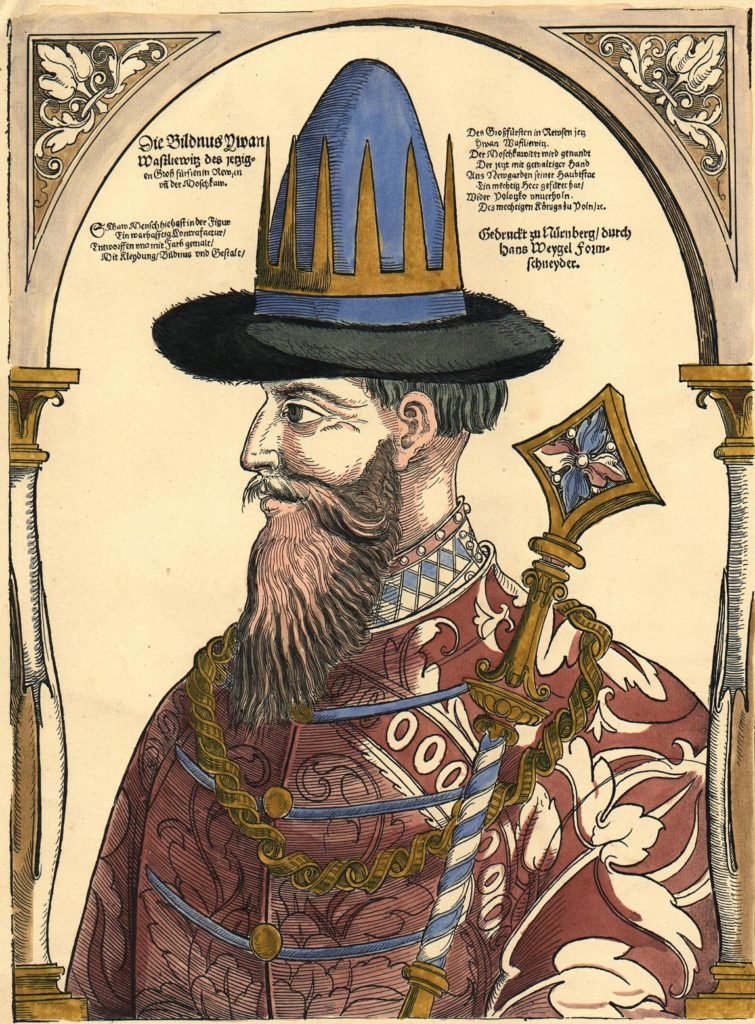
Ivan IV of Russia

Half-a-year later, a Polish-Lithuanian-Livonian alliance was established by the Treaty of Pozvol. Russia reacted promptly and invaded Livonia, starting the Livonian War between Denmark, Livonia, Poland-Lithuania, Russia and Sweden (1558–1583). The Grand Master of the Teutonic Order State in Livonia, Gotthard von Kettler, subordinated the order's territory and himself to Poland-Lithuania in the Treaties of Vilna (1559 and 1561), but those measures did not prevent Russian occupation of most of Livonia.

Eric XIV, Swedish king since 1560, coveted the Livonian port of Reval (Tallinn), and the Russo-Swedish truce was re-negotiated and set to last twenty years in August 1561 with Reval subordinating itself to Swedish rule. In the Treaty of Dorpat (Tartu, May 1564), Ivan IV of Russia accepted the subordinance of Reval and some Livonian castles to Erik XIV, and in turn Erik XIV accepted the subordinance of the rest of Livonia to Ivan IV. Russian-Swedish relations deteriorated when prince and later king John III of Sweden married Catherine Jagellon who before had rejected Ivan IV. In early 1565, another truce was signed with Sweden, this time set to last seven years. In 1566, Russia and Poland-Lithuania held talks about an expulsion of the Swedes from Livonia and a partition of Livonia among themselves. In 1570, Magnus of Livonia was made king of Livonia in Moscow as a vassal of Ivan IV, and pursued to siege Reval supplied with 20,000 Russian soldiers and 15,000 rubels granted to him by the tsar. Magnus soon defected and Russia was defeated by Sweden and the Polish-Lithuanian Commonwealth in the Livonian War that ended with the treaty of Plussa. After renewed hostilities however, the conflict would not be concluded until the Treaty of Teusina in 1595 whereby the borders according to the peace of Nöteborg between Sweden and Novgorod from 1323 were finally agreed between Sweden and Russia. Russia had to resign all claims to Estonia.

== Sources ==
=== Bibliography ===
- De Madariaga, Isabel (2006). Ivan the Terrible. Yale University Press. ISBN 0-300-11973-9.
- Heininen, Simo; Heikkilä, Markku (2002). Kirchengeschichte Finnlands (in German). Vandenhoeck & Ruprecht. ISBN 3-525-55444-3.
