= Treaty of Pozvol =

1557 treaty between the Livonian Confederation and Poland–Lithuania

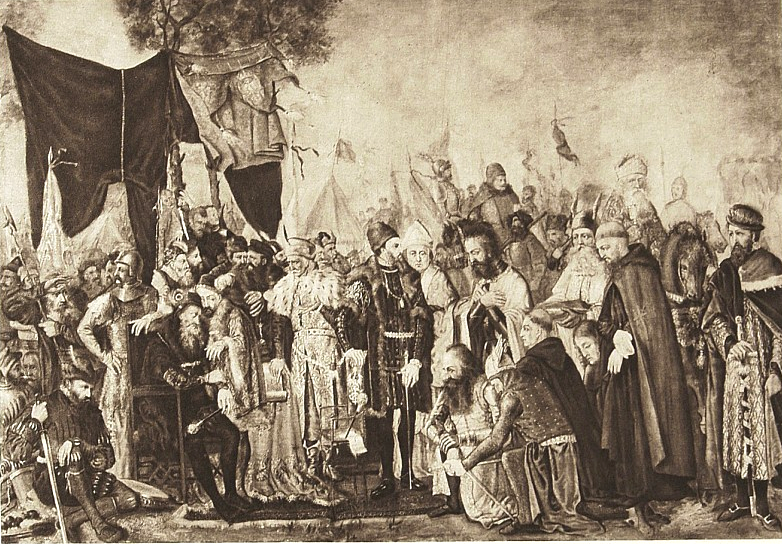
Conclusion of the Treaty of Pozvol in 1557. Painting by Maurycy Gottlieb, 1874.

The Treaty or Peace of Pozvol, Pasvalys or Pozwol was a peace treaty and an alliance concluded on 5 and 14 September 1557 between the Livonian Confederation and the Polish-Lithuanian union, whereby the former put its territories under Polish-Lithuanian protection. The treaty was preceded by disputes between the members of the Livonian Confederation and military pressure by Sigismund II Augustus, King of Poland and Grand Duke of Lithuania, and provoked Russian tsar Ivan IV "the Terrible" to start the Livonian War.

== Background ==
Livonian Confederation. The map shows the situation after the medieval Northern Crusades, which remained largely unchanged until the Northern Wars.

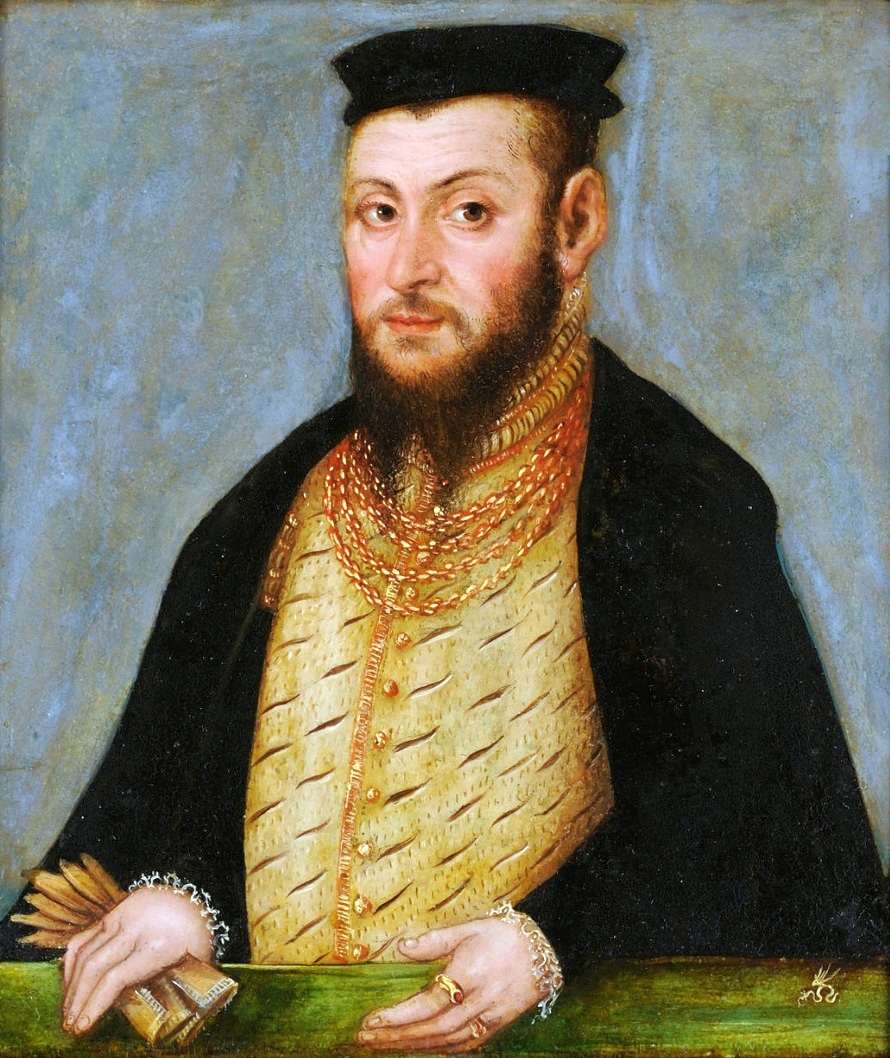
Sigismund II Augustus by Lucas Cranach the Younger

Albert (Albrecht), Grand Master of the Teutonic Knights, had introduced the Protestant Reformation and secularized the southern part of the Teutonic Order State, creating Europe's first Protestant state in the Duchy of Prussia in 1525 under Polish protection. His efforts to introduce Protestantism to the order's Livonian territories met with resistance and divided the Livonian Confederation.

When Albert's brother Wilhelm, who as Archbishop of Riga attempted to implement a Lutheran church order in his bishopric, appointed Protestant Christopher, Duke of Mecklenburg as his bishop coadjutor, the Catholic estates rebelled and arrested both Wilhelm and Christopher.

== Treaty ==
An ongoing Danish mediation of this conflict became void with the intervention of Sigismund II Augustus, king of Poland and Grand Duke of Lithuania and by the terms of Cracow protector of Wilhelm's brother, Albert. He demanded that Wilhelm and Christopher be released and the Livonian Confederation accept his protection. When he declared war and raised an army to underline his demands, which left for Livonia in July 1557, the Livonians gave in and signed three respective treaties on 14 September in the encampment of Sigismund II Augustus' army near Pozvol (Pasvalys, Podzwol, Pozwoł).

All three treaties concerned the relation between the Livonian estates and Sigismund. The first two treaties were the result of a mediation by envoys from the Holy Roman Empire, and were drafted on 5 September. Wilhelm was restored to his former position as archbishop, with his liberty and all former rights confirmed. Livonia restored its relation to Lithuania, and both realms concluded a defense-offense pact. The new grand master, Wilhelm von Fürstenberg, signed the alliance for the order and also ratified the other two treaties on 14 September along with other members of the order.

== Consequences ==
The alliance was directed against the Tsardom of Russia, then striving for hegemony in the area and regarding the treaty as a casus belli. Tsar Ivan IV "the Terrible", who in March had ended the Russo-Swedish War with the Treaty of Novgorod and since focussed on Livonia, claiming the subordination of Dorpat (Tartu) for a start.

The tsar reacted to Pozvol by invading Livonia before the alliance would result in an actual mobilization of forces, starting the Livonian War (1558–1583). As a result, Reval (Tallinn) turned to Sweden for protection, Ösel (Saaremaa) was occupied by Denmark-Norway, and the order's grand master Gotthard von Kettler secularized what was left of the Russian-occupied order state, formally subordinated it to Sigismund II Augustus, and established himself as duke of Courland.

== Sources ==
=== Bibliography ===
- De Madariaga, Isabel (2006). Ivan the Terrible. Yale University Press. p. 127. ISBN 0-300-11973-9.
- Frost, Robert I (2000). The Northern Wars. War, State and Society in Northeastern Europe 1558-1721. Longman. ISBN 978-0-582-06429-4.
- Kiaupa, Zigmantas (2005). The history of Lithuania (2 ed.). Baltos lankos. ISBN 9955-584-87-4.
- Lubieniecki, Stanisław (1995). Williams, George Huntston (ed.). History of the Polish Reformation. Harvard theological studies. Vol. 37. Fortress Press. ISBN 0-8006-7085-X.
- Macinnes, Allan I.; Riis, Thomas; Pedersen, Frederik, eds. (2000). Ships, guns, and Bibles in the North Sea and Baltic States, c. 1350-c. 1700. Northern European Historical Research Network Proceedings. Vol. 1. Tuckwell Press. ISBN 1-86232-167-1.
- Reddaway, William Fiddian (1978). The Cambridge history of Poland. Vol. 2. Octagon. ISBN 0-374-91250-5.
- Tiberg, Erik (1984). Zur Vorgeschichte des Livländischen Krieges. Acta Universitatis Upsaliensis. Studia historica Upsaliensia (in German). Vol. 134. Almqvist och Wiksell. ISBN 91-554-1509-1.
