= Union of Grodno =

Union of Grodno may refer to

- Union of Grodno (1432) between Poland and Lithuania
- Union of Grodno (1566) between Lithuania and Livonia
