= Treaty of Drohiczyn =

1581 treaty between Poland-Lithuania and Riga

The Treaty of Drohiczyn was concluded on 14 January 1581, during the Livonian War, between the city of Riga and the Polish–Lithuanian Commonwealth. The former Free imperial city Riga was added to Polish-Lithuanian Livonia. Its freedoms and privileges were in part confirmed in the Corpus Privilegiorum Stephanorum, but also limited. One of its burgomasters was to be appointed Burggraf, the Polish-Lithuanian official in town. Changes to the city's statutes required Royal approval. The Augsburg Confession was tolerated, but the city was deprived of the means to veto Royal interventions in its ecclesiastical affairs.

== Sources ==
- Tuchtenhagen, Ralph (2005). Geschichte der baltischen Länder. Beck'sche Reihe (in German). Vol. 2355. C.H.Beck. p. 37. ISBN 3-406-50855-3.
