= Livonian War =

16th-century war in Eastern Europe

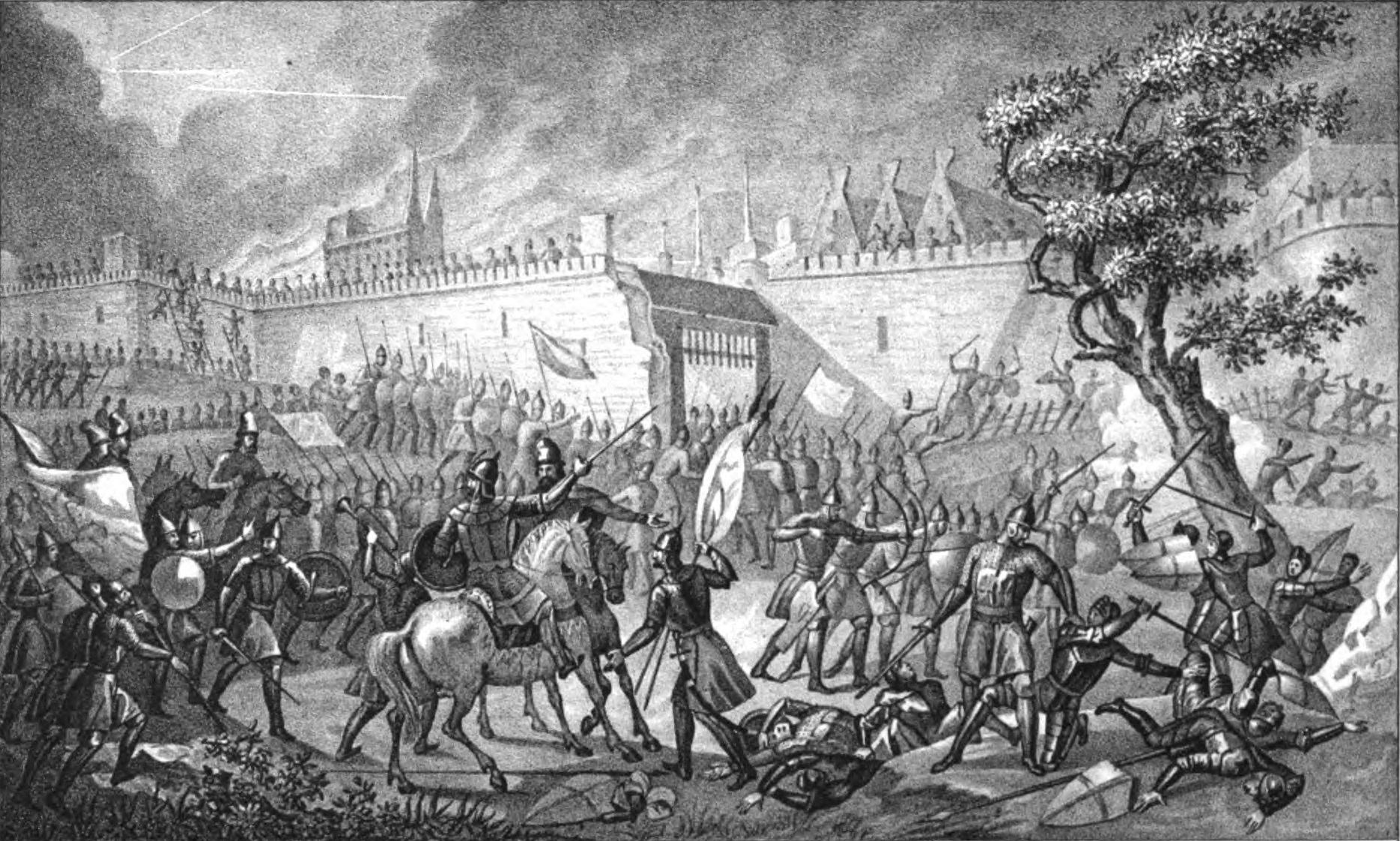
- Siege of Narva by the Russians in 1558, by Boris Chorikov, 1836
Date	22 January 1558 – 10 August 1583 (25 years, 6 months, 2 weeks and 5 days)
Location	Northern Europe: Estonia, Livonia, Ingria, Russia
Result	Dano-Norwegian, Polish–Lithuanian and Swedish victory
Territorial changes	Cession of: Estonia to Kingdom of Sweden; Livonia, Courland and Semigallia to Polish–Lithuanian Commonwealth; Ösel to Denmark–Norway

Belligerents
Livonian Confederation; Polish-Lithuanian Commonwealth (before 1569 the Polish–Lithuanian union); Denmark–Norway; Sweden; Transylvania (after 1577)	Russia; Qasim Khanate; Kingdom of Livonia

Commanders and leaders
(Polish–Lithuanian Commonwealth) Sigismund II Augustus (Polish–Lithuanian Commonwealth) Stephen Báthory; Landmeister von Fürstenburg; Gotthard Kettler (Denmark–Norway) Frederick II; Eric XIV; John III; Pontus De la Gardie	Ivan IV; Shahghali; Sain-Bulat; Magnus of Livonia

The Livonian War (1558–1583) concerned the control of Old Livonia (in the territory of present-day Estonia and Latvia). The Tsardom of Russia faced a varying coalition of the Dano-Norwegian Realm, the Kingdom of Sweden, and the Union (later Commonwealth) of the Grand Duchy of Lithuania and the Kingdom of Poland.

From 1558 to 1578, Russia dominated the region with early military successes at Dorpat (Tartu) and Narva. The Russian dissolution of the Livonian Confederation brought Poland–Lithuania into the conflict, and Sweden and Denmark-Norway intervened between 1559 and 1561. Swedish Estonia was established despite constant invasion from Russia, and Frederick II of Denmark-Norway bought the old Bishopric of Ösel–Wiek, which he placed under the control of his brother Magnus of Holstein. Magnus attempted to expand his Livonian holdings to establish the Russian vassal state, the Kingdom of Livonia, which nominally existed until his defection in 1576.

In 1576, Stephen Báthory became King of Poland as well as Grand Duke of Lithuania and turned the tide of the war with his successes between 1578 and 1581, including the joint Swedish–Polish–Lithuanian offensive at the Battle of Wenden. That was followed by an extended campaign through Russia, culminating in the long and difficult Siege of Pskov. Under the 1582 Truce of Jam Zapolski, which ended the war between Russia and Poland–Lithuania, Russia lost all of its former holdings in Livonia and Polotsk to Poland–Lithuania. The following year, Sweden and Russia signed the Truce of Plussa, with Sweden gaining most of Ingria and northern Livonia while retaining the Duchy of Estonia.

== Prelude ==
=== Pre-war Livonia ===
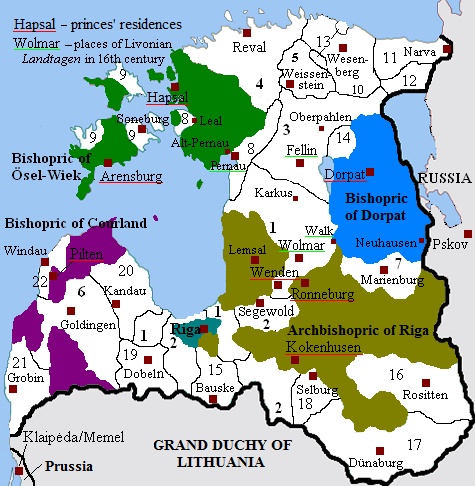
Old Livonia, before the Livonian War: Livonian Order Bishopric of Courland Bishopric of Ösel–Wiek Bishopric of Dorpat City of Riga Archbishopric of Riga

By the mid-16th century, economically prosperous Old Livonia had become a region organised into the decentralised and religiously divided Livonian Confederation. Its territories consisted of the Livonian branch of the Teutonic Order, the prince-bishoprics of Dorpat (Tartu), Ösel–Wiek, as well as Courland, the Archbishopric of Riga and the city of Riga. Together with Riga, the cities of Dorpat (Tartu) and Reval (Tallinn), along with the knightly estates, enjoyed privileges enabling them to act almost independently. The only common institutions of the Livonian estates were the regularly held common assemblies known as Landtags. As well as a divided political administration, there were also persistent rivalries between the Archbishop of Riga and the Landmeister of the Order for hegemony. (Note: The Order was led by a Hochmeister, an office that since 1525 had been executed by the Deutschmeister responsible for the bailiwicks in the Holy Roman Empire; the Order's organisation in Livonia was led by a circle of Gebietigers headed by a Landmeister elected from amongst the membership) A schism had existed within the Order since the Reformation had spread to Livonia in the 1520s, although the transformation of the country into a Lutheran region was a gradual process, resisted by part of the Order that to a varying degree remained sympathetic to Roman Catholicism. As war approached, Livonia had a weak administration subject to internal rivalries, lacked any powerful defences or outside support, and was surrounded by monarchies pursuing expansionist policies. Robert I. Frost notes of the volatile region: "Racked with internal bickering and threatened by the political machinations of its neighbours, Livonia was in no state to resist an attack."

The Order's Landmeister and the Gebietigers, as well as the owners of Livonian estates, were all lesser nobles who guarded their privileges and influence by preventing the creation of a higher, more powerful noble class. Only the archbishopric of Riga successfully overcame resistance of the lesser nobles. Wilhelm von Brandenburg was appointed as Archbishop of Riga and Christoph von Mecklenburg as his Coadjutor, with the help of his brother Albert (Albrecht) of Brandenburg–Ansbach, the former Prussian Hochmeister who had secularised the southern Teutonic Order state and in 1525 established himself as duke in Prussia. Wilhelm and Christoph were to pursue Albert's interests in Livonia, among which was the establishment of a hereditary Livonian duchy styled after the Prussian model. At the same time the Order agitated for its re-establishment ("Rekuperation") in Prussia, opposed secularization, and creation of a hereditary duchy.

=== Aspirations of Livonia's neighbours ===
By the time the Livonian War broke out, the Hanseatic League had already lost its monopoly on the profitable and prosperous Baltic Sea trade. While still involved and with increasing sales, it now shared the market with European mercenary fleets, most notably from the Dutch Seventeen Provinces and France. The Hanseatic vessels were no match for contemporary warships, and since the league was unable to maintain a large navy because of a declining share of trade, its Livonian members Riga, Reval (Tallinn), and trading partner Narva were left without suitable protection. The Danish navy, the most powerful in the Baltic Sea, controlled the entrance to the Baltic Sea, collected requisite tolls, and held the strategically important Baltic Sea islands of Bornholm and Gotland.

A long bar of Danish territories in the south and lack of sufficient year-round ice-free ports severely limited Sweden's access to Baltic trade. Nevertheless, the country prospered due to exports of timber, iron, and most notably copper, coupled with the advantages of a growing navy and proximity to the Livonian ports across the narrow Gulf of Finland. Before the Livonian War, Sweden had sought expansion into Livonia, but the intervention of the Russian tsar temporarily stalled these efforts through the Russo-Swedish War of 1554–1557, which culminated in the 1557 Treaty of Novgorod.

Through its absorption of the principalities of Novgorod (1478) and Pskov (1510), the Tsardom of Russia had become Livonia's eastern neighbour and grown stronger after annexing the khanates of Kazan (1552) and Astrakhan (1556). The conflict between Russia and the Western powers was exacerbated by Russia's isolation from sea trade. The new Ivangorod port – built in 1550 during the reign of Tsar Ivan IV on the eastern shore of the Narva River – was considered unsatisfactory on account of its shallow waters. Thereafter the tsar demanded that the Livonian Confederation pay about 6,000 marks to keep the Bishopric of Dorpat, based on the claim that every adult male had paid Pskov one mark when it had been an independent state. The Livonians eventually promised to pay this sum to Ivan by 1557, but were sent from Moscow when they failed to do so, ending negotiations. Ivan continued to point out that the existence of the Order required passive Russian support, and was quick to threaten use of military force if necessary. He aimed to establish a corridor between the Baltic and the new territories on the Caspian Sea, because if Russia were to engage in open conflict with major western powers, it would need imports of more sophisticated weaponry.

The Polish King and Lithuanian Grand Duke Sigismund II Augustus was wary of Russian expansionist aspirations. Expansion of Russia into Livonia would have meant not only a stronger political rival but also loss of lucrative trade routes. Therefore, Sigismund supported his cousin Wilhelm von Brandenburg, archbishop of Riga, in his conflicts with Wilhelm von Fürstenberg, the Livonian Order's landmeister. Sigismund hoped that Livonia, just like the Duchy of Prussia under Duke Albert, would become a vassal state of Poland–Lithuania. With weak support in Livonia, von Brandenburg had to largely rely on external allies. Among his few Livonian supporters was landmarschall Jasper von Munster, with whom he planned an April 1556 attack on his opponents that would involve military aid from both Sigismund and Albert. However, Sigismund hesitated over participation in the action, fearing that it would leave the Kiev Voivodeship exposed to a pending Russian attack. When von Fürstenberg learned of the plan, he led a force into the archbishopric of Riga and in June 1556 captured the main strongholds of Kokenhusen and Ronneburg. Jasper von Munster fled to Lithuania, but von Brandenburg and Christoph von Mecklenburg were captured and detained at Adsel and Treiden. This resulted in a diplomatic mission to petition for their release being dispatched by the Pomeranian dukes, the Danish King, Emperor Ferdinand I, and the estates of the Holy Roman Empire. A cross-party meeting in Lübeck to resolve the conflict was scheduled for 1 April 1557, but was cancelled due to quarrels between Sigismund and the Danish envoys. Sigismund used the killing of his envoy Lancki by the landmeister's son as an excuse to invade the southern portion of Livonia with an army of around 80,000. He forced the competing parties in Livonia to reconcile at his camp in Pozvol in September 1557. There they signed the Treaty of Pozvol, which created a mutual defensive and offensive alliance, with its primary target Russia, and provoked the Livonian War.

== 1558–1562: Dissolution of the Livonian Order ==
=== Russian invasion of Livonia ===
Map of campaigns in Livonia, 1558–1560

Ivan IV regarded the Livonian Confederation's approach to the Polish–Lithuanian union for protection under the Treaty of Pozvol as casus belli. In 1554 Livonia and Russia had signed a fifteen-year truce in which Livonia agreed not to enter into an alliance with Poland–Lithuania. On 22 January 1558, Ivan reacted with the invasion of Livonia. The Russians were seen by local peasants as liberators from the German control of Livonia. Many Livonian fortresses surrendered without resistance while Russian troops took Dorpat (Tartu) in May, Narva in July (Note: De Madariaga 2006, p. 128 says Narva in May and Dorpat in July.) and laid siege to Reval (Tallinn). Reinforced by 1,200 Landsknechts, 100 gunners, and ammunition from Germany, Livonian forces successfully retook Wesenberg (Rakvere) along with a number of other fortresses. Although the Germans raided Russian territory, Dorpat (Tartu), Narva, and many lesser fortresses remained in Russian hands. The initial Russian advance was led by the Khan of Qasim Shahghali, with two other Tatar princes at the head of a force that included Russian boyars, Tatar, and Pomestnoe cavalry, as well as Cossacks, who at that time were mostly armed foot soldiers. Ivan gained further ground in campaigns during the years 1559 and 1560. In January 1559, Russian forces again invaded Livonia. A six-month truce covering May to November was signed between Russia and Livonia while Russia fought in the Russo-Crimean Wars.

Prompted by the Russian invasion, Livonia first unsuccessfully sought help from Emperor Ferdinand I, then turned to Poland–Lithuania. Landmeister von Fürstenburg fled to Poland–Lithuania to be replaced by Gotthard Kettler. In June 1559, the estates of Livonia came under Polish–Lithuanian protection through the first Treaty of Vilnius. The Polish sejm refused to agree to the treaty, believing it to be a matter affecting only the Grand Duchy of Lithuania. In January 1560, Sigismund sent ambassador Martin Volodkov to the court of Ivan in Moscow in an attempt to stop the Russian cavalry rampaging through rural Livonia.

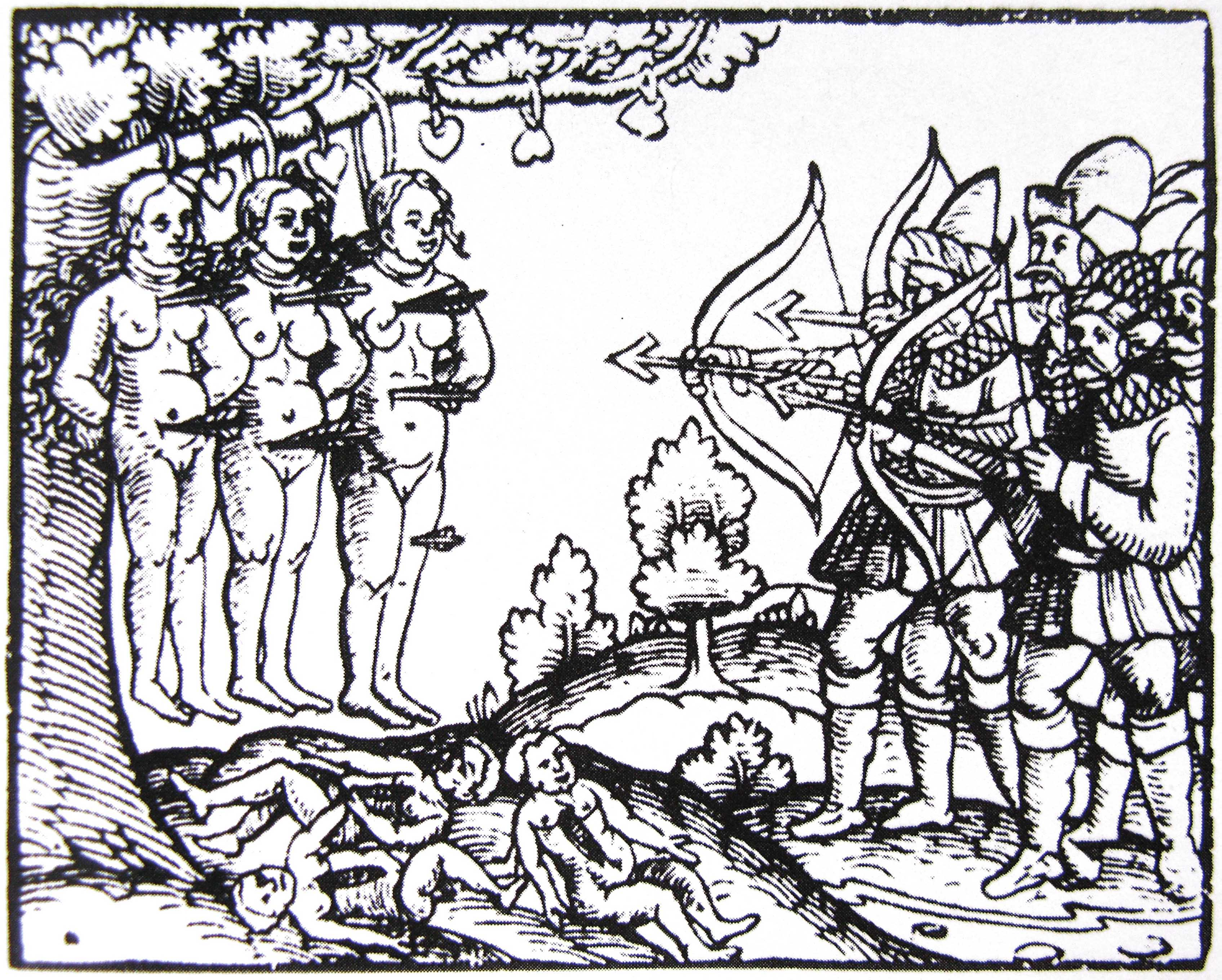
Russian atrocities in Livonia. Printed in Zeyttung published in Nuremberg in 1561.

Russian successes followed similar patterns featuring a multitude of small campaigns, with sieges where musketmen played a key role in destroying wooden defences with effective artillery support. The Tsar's forces took important fortresses like Fellin (Viljandi), yet lacked the means to gain the major cities of Riga, Reval (Tallinn), or Pernau (Pärnu). The Livonian knights suffered a disastrous defeat by the Russians at the Battle of Ērģeme in August 1560. Some historians believe the Russian nobility were split over the timing of the invasion of Livonia.

Eric XIV, the new King of Sweden, turned down Kettler's requests for assistance, along with a similar request from Poland. Kettler turned to Sigismund for help. The weakened Livonian Order was dissolved by the second Treaty of Vilnius in 1561. Its lands were secularised as the Duchy of Livonia and Duchy of Courland and Semigallia and assigned to the Grand Duchy of Lithuania. Kettler became the first Duke of Courland, in doing so converting to Lutheranism. Included in the treaty was the Privilegium Sigismundi Augusti by which Sigismund guaranteed the Livonian estates privileges including religious freedom with respect to the Augsburg Confession, the Indygenat, and continuation of the traditional German administration. The terms regarding religious freedom forbade any regulation of the Protestant order by religious or secular authorities.

Some members of the Lithuanian nobility opposed the growing Polish–Lithuanian union and offered the Lithuanian crown to Ivan IV. The Tsar publicly advertised this option, either because he took the offer seriously, or because he needed time to strengthen his Livonian troops. Throughout 1561, a Russo-Lithuanian truce (with a scheduled expiration date of 1562) was respected by both sides.

=== Danish and Swedish interventions ===
In return for a loan and a guarantee of Danish protection, Bishop Johann von Münchhausen signed a treaty on 26 September 1559 giving Frederick II of Denmark-Norway the right to nominate the bishop of Ösel–Wiek, an act which amounted to the sale of these territories for 30,000 thalers. Frederick II nominated his brother, Duke Magnus of Holstein as bishop, who then took possession in April 1560. Lest Danish efforts create more insecurity for Sweden, Denmark-Norway made another attempt to mediate a peace in the region. Magnus at once pursued his own interests, purchasing the Bishopric of Courland without Frederick's consent and trying to expand into Harrien–Wierland (Harju and Virumaa). This brought him into direct conflict with Eric.

In 1561, Swedish forces arrived and the noble corporations of Harrien–Wierland and Jerwen (Järva) yielded to Sweden to form the Duchy of Estonia. Reval (Tallinn), similarly, accepted Swedish rule. Denmark-Norway dominated the Baltic, and Sweden wished to challenge this by gaining territory on the Eastern side of the Baltic. Doing so would help Sweden control the West's trade with Russia. This helped to precipitate the Northern Seven Years' War since in 1561, Frederick II had already protested against Swedish presence in Reval (Tallinn), claiming historical rights relating to Danish Estonia. When Eric XIV's forces seized Pernau (Pärnu) in June 1562, his diplomats tried to arrange Swedish protection for Riga, which brought him into conflict with Sigismund.

Sigismund maintained close relations with Eric XIV's brother, John, Duke of Finland (later John III), and in October 1562 John married Sigismund's sister, Catherine, thereby preventing her marrying Ivan IV. While Eric XIV had approved the marriage, he was upset when John lent Sigismund 120,000 dalers and received seven Livonian castles as security. This incident led to John's capture and imprisonment in August 1563 on Eric XIV's behalf, whereupon Sigismund allied with Denmark and Lübeck against Eric XIV in October the same year.

== 1562–1570 ==
The intervention of Denmark-Norway, Sweden, and Poland-Lithuania into Livonia began a period of struggle for control of the Baltic, known contemporaneously as the dominium maris baltici. While the initial war years were characterised by intensive fighting, a period of low-intensity warfare began in 1562 and lasted until 1570 when fighting once more intensified. Denmark, Sweden, and to some extent Poland–Lithuania were occupied with the Nordic Seven Years' War (1563–1570) taking place in the Western Baltic, but Livonia remained strategically important. In 1562, Denmark and Russia concluded the Treaty of Mozhaysk, respecting each other's claims in Livonia and maintaining amicable relations. In 1564, Sweden and Russia concluded a seven-years truce. Both Ivan IV and Eric XIV showed signs of mental disorder, with Ivan IV turning against part of the Tsardom's nobility and people with the oprichina that began in 1565, leaving Russia in a state of political chaos and civil war.

=== Russian war with Lithuania ===
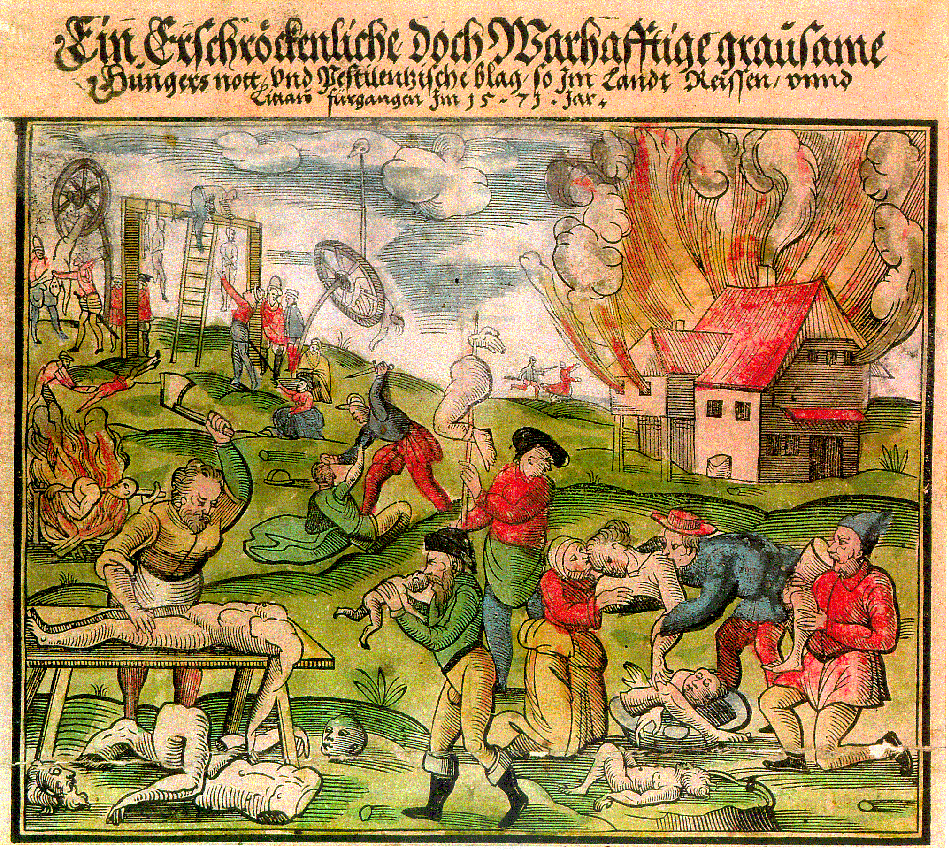
Cannibalism in Lithuania during the Russian invasion in 1571, German plate

When the Russo-Lithuanian truce expired in 1562, Ivan IV rejected Sigismund's offer of an extension. The Tsar had used the period of the truce to build up his forces in Livonia, and he invaded Lithuania. His army raided Vitebsk and, after a series of border clashes, took Polotsk in 1563. Lithuanian victories came at the Battle of Ula in 1564 and at Czasniki (Chashniki) in 1567, a period of intermittent conflict between the two sides. Ivan continued to gain ground among the towns and villages of central Livonia but was held at the coast by Lithuania. The defeats of Ula and Czasniki, along with the defection of Andrey Kurbsky, led Ivan IV to move his capital to the Alexandrov Kremlin while the perceived opposition against him was repressed by his oprichniki.

A "grand" party of diplomats left Lithuania for Moscow in May 1566. Lithuania was prepared to split Livonia with Russia, with a view to a joint offensive to drive Sweden from the area. However, this was seen as a sign of weakness by Russian diplomats, who instead suggested that Russia take the whole of Livonia, including Riga, through the ceding of Courland in southern Livonia and Polotsk on the Lithuanian–Russian border. The transfer of Riga, and the surrounding entrance to the River Dvina, troubled the Lithuanians, since much of their trade depended on safe passage through it and they had already built fortifications to protect it. Ivan expanded his demands in July, calling for Ösel in addition to Dorpat (Tartu) and Narva. No agreement was forthcoming and a ten-day break was taken in negotiations, during which time various Russian meetings were held (including the zemsky sobor, the Assembly of the Land) to discuss the issues at stake. Within the Assembly, the church's representative stressed the need to "keep" Riga (though it had not yet been conquered), while the Boyars were less keen on an overall peace with Lithuania, noting the danger posed by a joint Polish-Lithuanian state. Talks were then halted and hostilities resumed upon the return of the ambassadors to Lithuania.

In 1569, the Treaty of Lublin unified Poland and Lithuania into the Polish–Lithuanian Commonwealth. The Duchy of Livonia, tied to Lithuania in real union since the Union of Grodno in 1566, came under Polish–Lithuanian joint sovereignty. In June 1570 a three-year truce was signed with Russia. Sigismund II, the Commonwealth's first King, died in 1572 leaving the Polish throne with no clear successor for the first time since 1382 and thus began the first free election in Polish history. Some Lithuanian nobles, in an effort to retain Lithuanian autonomy, proposed a Russian candidate. Ivan, however, demanded the return of Kiev, an Orthodox coronation, and a hereditary monarchy in parallel to Russia's, with his son, Feodor, as King. The electorate rejected these demands and instead chose Henry of Valois (Henryk Walezy), brother of King Charles IX of France.

=== Russian war with Sweden ===
In 1564, Sweden and Russia agreed the Treaty of Dorpat, whereby Russia recognised Sweden's right to Reval (Tallinn) and other castles, and Sweden accepted Russia's patrimony over the rest of Livonia. A seven-year truce was signed between Russia and Sweden in 1565. Eric XIV of Sweden was overthrown in 1568 after he killed several nobles in the Sture Murders (Sturemorden) of 1567, and was replaced by his half-brother John III. Both Russia and Sweden had other problems and were keen to avoid an expensive escalation of the war in Livonia. Ivan IV had requested the delivery of John's wife, the Polish-Lithuanian princess Catherine Jagellonica, to Russia, since he had competed with John to marry into the Lithuanian-Polish royal family. In July 1569 John sent a party to Russia, led by Paul Juusten, Bishop of Åbo, which arrived in Novgorod in September, following the arrival in Moscow of the ambassadors sent to Sweden in 1567 by Ivan to retrieve Catherine. Ivan refused to meet with the party himself, forcing them to negotiate instead with the Governor of Novgorod. The Tsar requested that Swedish envoys should greet the governor as 'the brother of their king', but Juusten refused to do so. The Governor then ordered an attack on the Swedish party, that their clothes and money be taken, and that they be deprived of food and drink and be paraded naked through the streets.

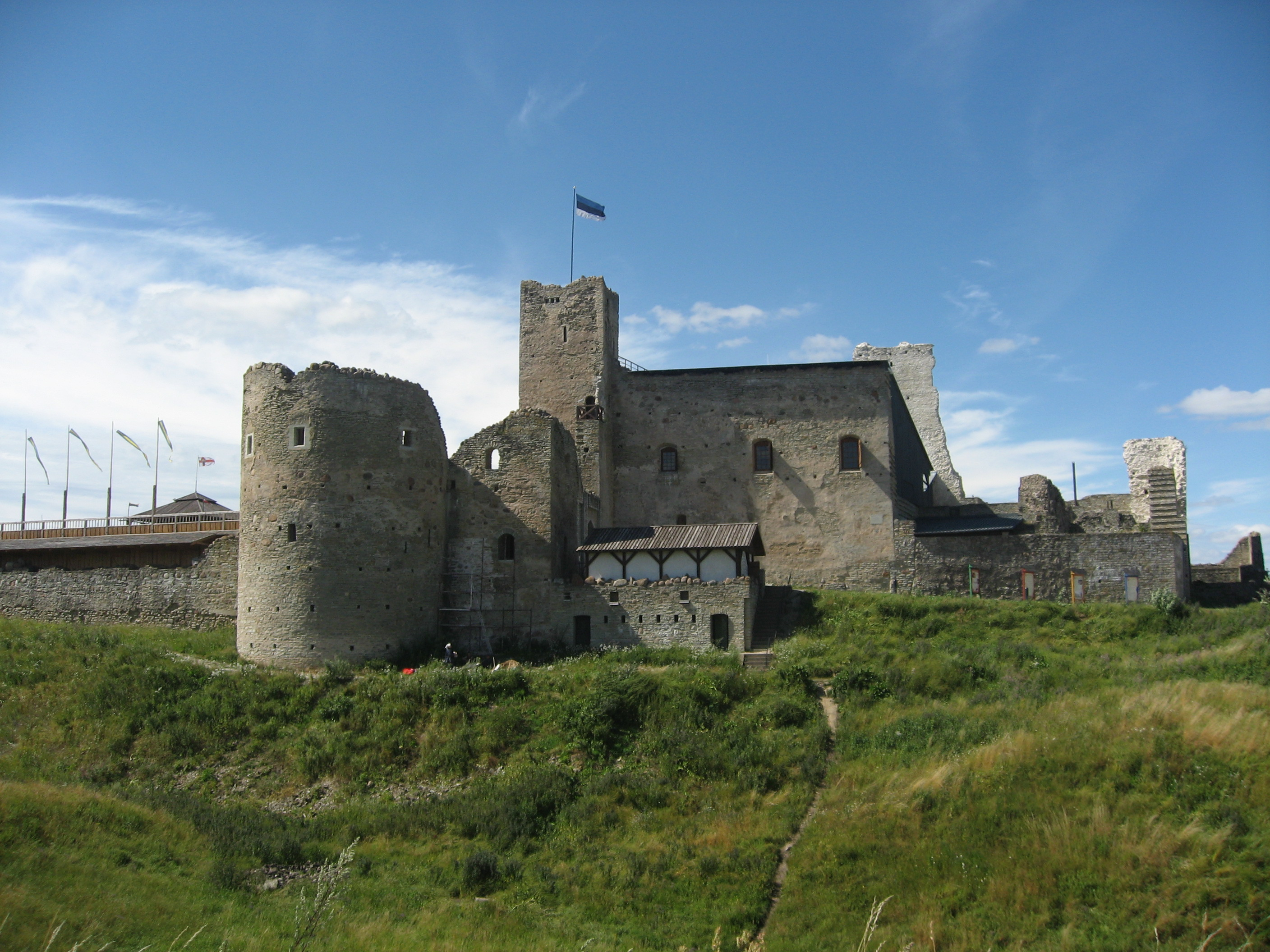
Rakvere castle ruins, Lääne-Viru County, Estonia.

Although the Swedes were also to be moved to Moscow, this occurred at the same time Ivan and his oprichniki were on their way to launch an assault on Novgorod in northern Russia. In an act of vengeance against the perceived treason of the local Orthodox church in Novgorod, Ivan's forces launched an attack on the city, where 2,000–15,000 people were killed.

On his return to Moscow in May 1570, Ivan refused to meet the Swedish party, and with the signing of a three-year truce in June 1570 with the Commonwealth he no longer feared war with Poland–Lithuania. Russia considered the delivery of Catherine to be a precondition of any deal, and the Swedes agreed to meet in Novgorod to discuss the matter. According to Juusten, at the meeting the Russians demanded the Swedes to abandon their claim to Reval (Tallinn), provide two or three hundred cavalry when required, pay 10,000 thaler in direct compensation, surrender Finnish silver mines near the border with Russia, and allow the Tsar to style himself "Lord of Sweden". The Swedish party left following an ultimatum from Ivan that Sweden should cede its territory in Livonia or there would be war. Juusten was left behind while John rejected Ivan's demands, and war broke out anew.

=== Impact of the Northern Seven Years' War ===
Quarrels between Denmark-Norway and Sweden led to the Northern Seven Years' War in 1563, which ended in 1570 with the Treaty of Stettin. Primarily fought in western and southern Scandinavia, the war involved important naval battles fought in the Baltic. When Danish-held Varberg surrendered to Swedish forces in 1565, 150 Danish mercenaries escaped the subsequent massacre of the garrison by defecting to Sweden. Among them was Pontus de la Gardie, who thereafter became an important Swedish commander in the Livonian War. Livonia was also affected by the naval campaign of Danish admiral Peder Munk, who bombarded Swedish Reval (Tallinn) from sea in July 1569.

The Treaty of Stettin made Denmark the supreme and dominating power in Northern Europe, yet failed to restore the Kalmar Union. Unfavourable conditions for Sweden led to a series of conflicts that only ended with the Great Northern War in 1720. Sweden agreed to turn over her possessions in Livonia in return for a payment by Holy Roman Emperor Maximilian II. Maximilian failed to pay the promised compensation, however, and thereby lost his influence on Baltic affairs. The terms of the treaty regarding Livonia were ignored, and thus the Livonian War continued. From Ivan's point of view, the treaty enabled the powers involved to form an alliance against him, now that they were no longer fighting each other.

== 1570–1577: Russian dominance and the Kingdom of Livonia ==
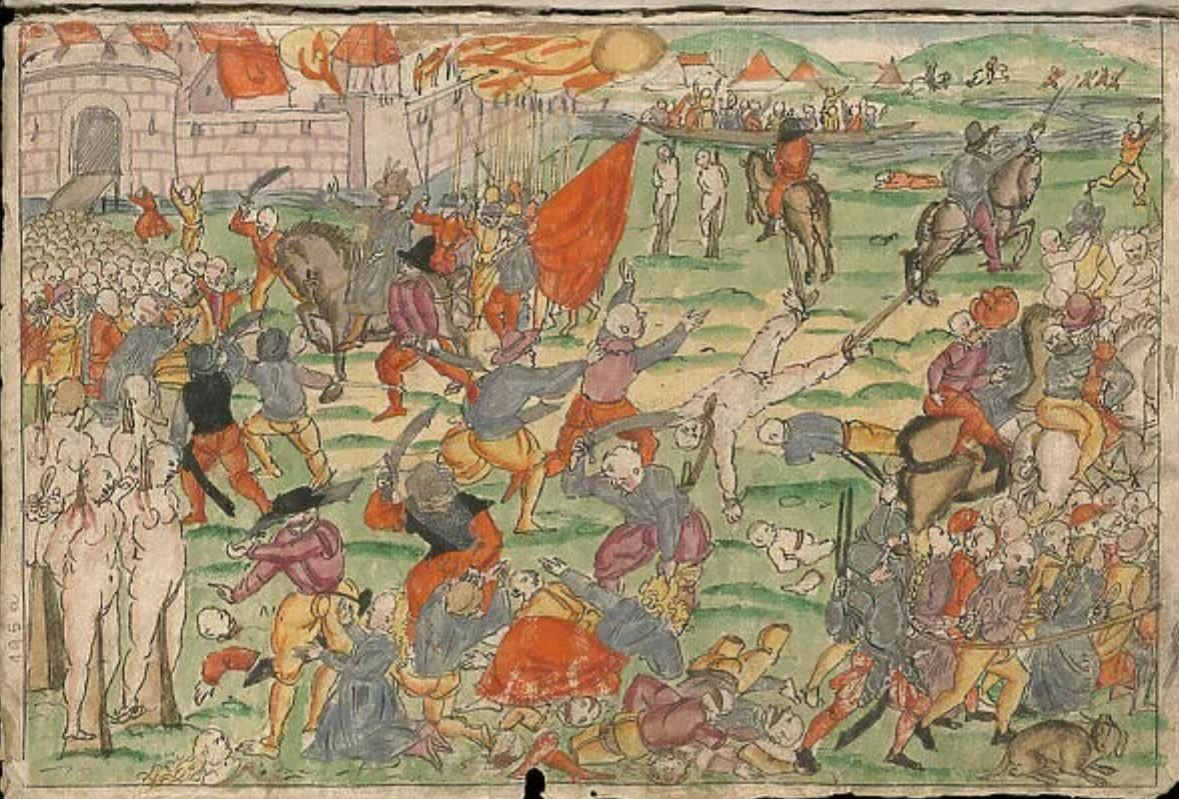
Russian atrocities in 1577.

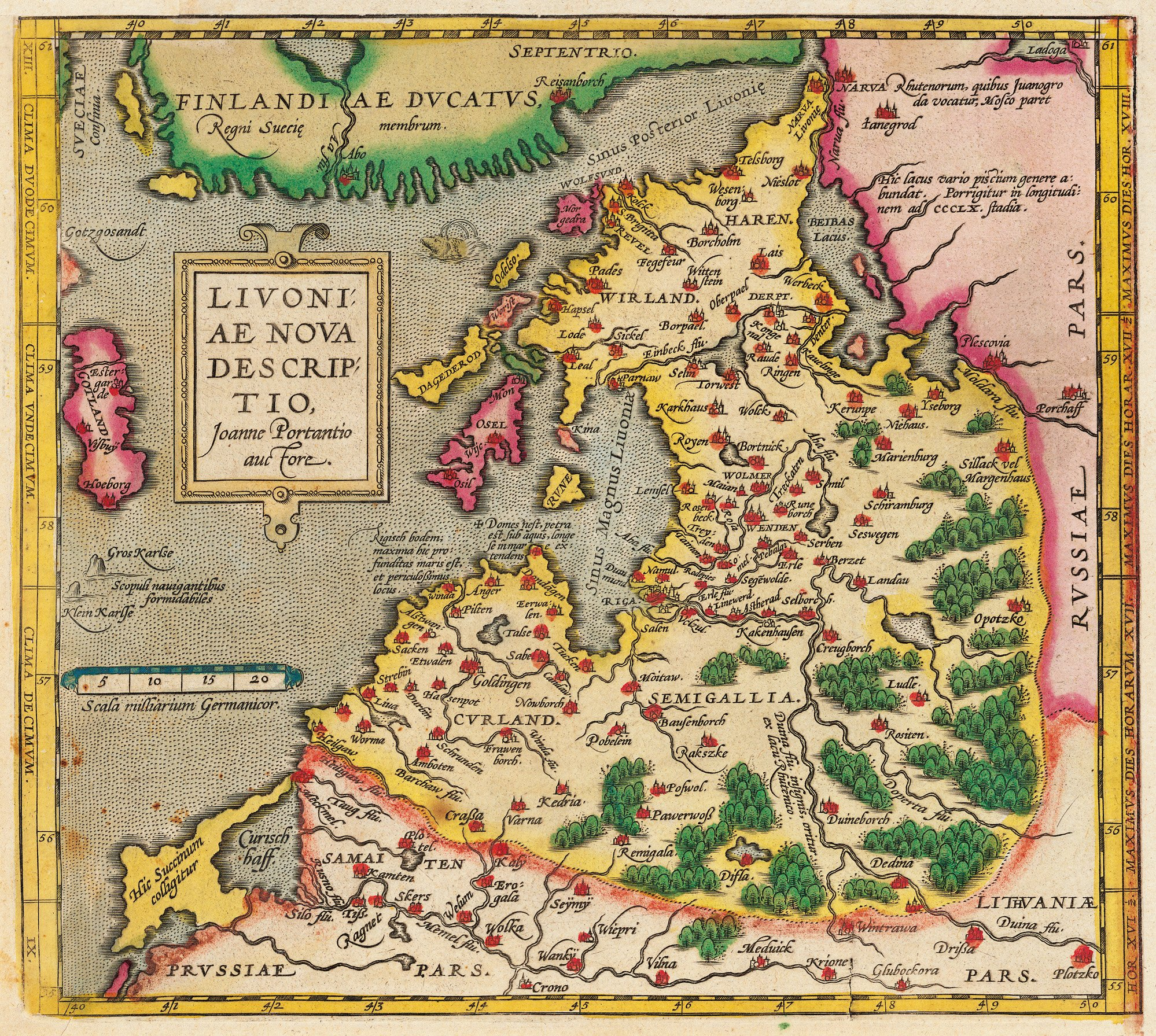
Map of Livonia in 1573.

Map showing areas of Russian and Polish–Lithuanian forces, 1570–1577.
occupied by Russian forces in 1570
occupied by Russian forces 1572–1577
occupied by Lithuanian forces

During the early 1570s, King John III of Sweden faced a Russian offensive on his positions in Estonia. Reval (Tallinn) withstood a Russian siege in 1570 and 1571, but several smaller towns were taken by Russian forces. On 23 January a Swedish army of 700 infantry and 600 cavalry under command of Clas Åkesson Tott (the Elder) clashed with a Russian and Tartar army of 16,000 men under the command of Khan Sain-Bulat at the Battle of Lode by the village of Koluvere. The Russian advance concluded with the sacking of Weissenstein (Paide) in 1573, where, after its capture, the occupying forces roasted some of the leaders of the Swedish garrison alive, including the commander. This triggered a retaliatory campaign by John centred on Wesenberg, to which the army departed in November 1573 with Klas Åkesson Tott in overall command and Pontus de la Gardie as field commander. There were also Russian raids into Finland, including one as far as Helsingfors (Helsinki) in 1572. A two-year truce on this front was signed in 1575.

John's counter-offensive stalled at the siege of Wesenberg in 1574, when German and Scottish units of the Swedish army turned against each other. This failure has also been blamed on the difficulties of fighting in the bitter winter conditions, particularly for the infantry. The war in Livonia was a great financial burden for Sweden, and by the end of 1573, Sweden's German mercenaries were owed 200,000 daler. John gave them the castles of Hapsal, Leal, and Lode as security, but when he failed to pay they were sold to Denmark.

Meanwhile, efforts by Magnus to besiege Swedish-controlled Reval (Tallinn) were faltering, with support from neither Ivan nor Magnus' brother, Frederick II of Denmark forthcoming. Ivan's attention was focused elsewhere, while Frederick's reluctance perhaps stemmed from a new spirit of Swedish–Danish unity that made him unwilling to invade Livonia on behalf of Magnus, whose state was a vassal of Russia. The siege was abandoned in March 1571, whereupon Swedish action in the Baltic escalated, with the passive backing of Sigismund, John's brother-in-law.

At the same time Crimean Tatars devastated Russian territories and burned and looted Moscow during the Russo-Crimean Wars. Drought and epidemics had fatally affected the Russian economy while oprichnina had thoroughly disrupted the government. Following the defeat of Crimean and Nogai forces in 1572, oprichnina was wound down and with it the way Russian armies were formed also changed. Ivan IV had introduced a new strategy whereby he relied on tens of thousands of native troops, Cossacks and Tatars instead of a few thousand skilled troops and mercenaries, as was the practice of his adversaries.

Ivan's campaign reached its height in 1576 when another 30,000 Russian soldiers crossed into Livonia in 1577 and devastated Danish areas in retaliation for the Danish acquisition of Hapsal, Leal, and Lode. Danish influence in Livonia ceased, as Frederick accepted deals with Sweden and Poland to end nominal Danish involvement. Swedish forces were besieged in Reval (Tallinn) and central Livonia raided as far as Dünaburg (Daugavpils), formally under Polish–Lithuanian control since the 1561 Treaty of Vilnius. The conquered territories submitted to Ivan or his vassal, Magnus, declared monarch of the Kingdom of Livonia in 1570. Magnus defected from Ivan IV during the same year, having started to appropriate castles without consulting the Tsar. When Kokenhusen (Koknese) submitted to Magnus to avoid fighting Ivan IV's army, the Tsar sacked the town and executed its German commanders. The campaign then focussed on Wenden (Cēsis, Võnnu), "the heart of Livonia", which as the former capital of the Livonian Order was not only of strategic importance, but also symbolic of Livonia itself.

== 1577–1583: Defeat of Russia ==
=== Swedish and Polish–Lithuanian alliance and counter-offensives ===
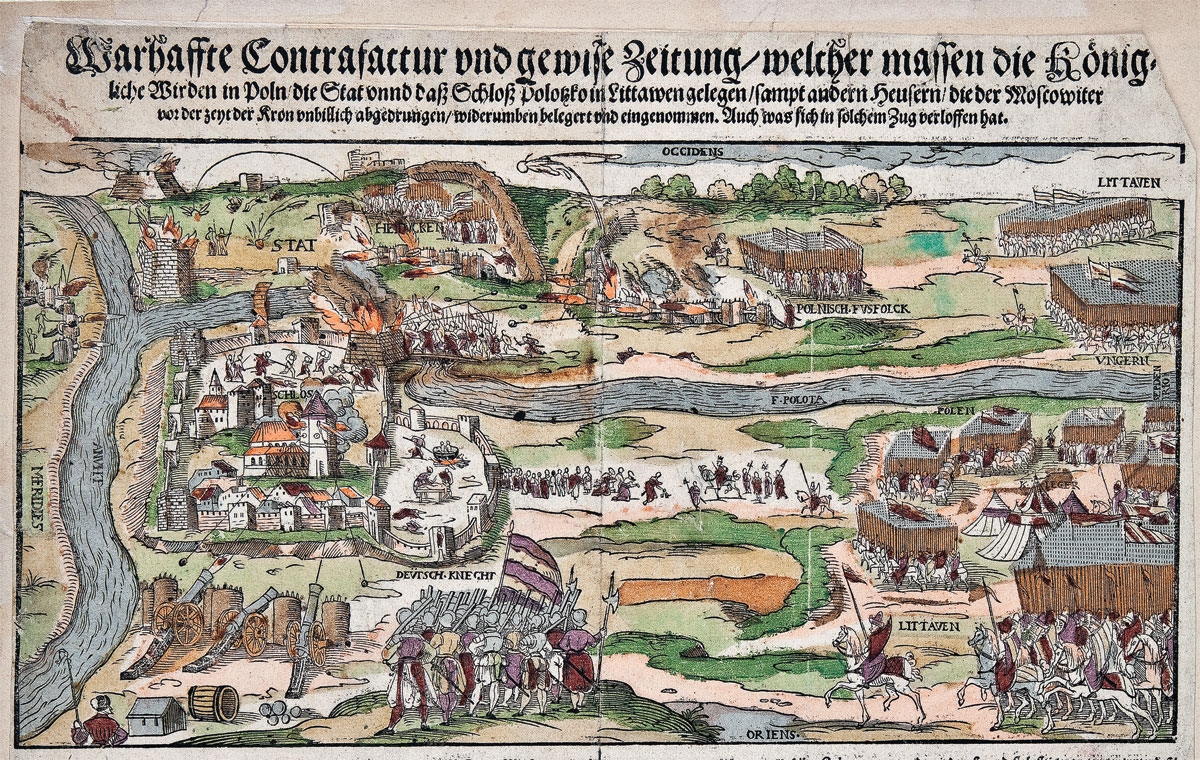
The siege of Polotsk, 1579, in a contemporary illustration.

The campaigns of Stephen Báthory, the bold line marks the border by 1600.

In 1576, the Transylvanian prince Stephen Báthory became King of Poland and Grand Duke of Lithuania after a contested election to the joint Polish–Lithuanian throne with the Habsburg Emperor Maximilian II. Both Báthory's fiancée Anna Jagiellon and Maximilian II had been proclaimed elected to the same throne in December 1575, three days apart; Maximilan's death in October 1576 prevented the conflict from escalating. Báthory, ambitious to expel Ivan IV from Livonia, was constrained by the opposition of Danzig (Gdansk), which resisted Báthory's accession with Danish support. The ensuing Danzig War of 1577 ended when Báthory conceded further autonomous rights to the city in return for a payment of 200,000 zlotys. For a further 200,000 zloty payment, he appointed Hohenzollern George Frederick as administrator of Prussia and secured the latter's military support in the planned campaign against Russia.

Báthory received only few soldiers from his Polish vassals and was forced to recruit mercenaries, primarily Poles, Hungarians, Bohemians, Germans, and Wallachians. A separate Szekler brigade fought in Livonia.

Swedish King John III and Stephen Báthory allied against Ivan IV in December 1577, despite problems caused by the death of Sigismund which meant that the issue of the substantial inheritance due to John's wife, Catherine, had not been resolved. Poland also claimed the whole of Livonia, without accepting Swedish rule of any part of it. The 120,000 daler lent in 1562 had still not been repaid, despite Sigismund's best intentions to settle it.

By November, Lithuanian forces moving northward had captured Dünaburg while a Polish–Swedish force took the town and castle of Wenden in early 1578. Russian forces failed to retake the town in February, an attack followed by a Swedish offensive, targeting Pernau (Pärnu), Dorpat, and Novgorod among others. In September, Ivan responded by sending in an army of 18,000 men, who recaptured Oberpahlen (Põltsamaa) from Sweden and then marched on Wenden. Upon their arrival at Wenden, the Russian army laid siege to the town, but was met by a relief force of around 6,000 German, Polish, and Swedish soldiers. In the ensuing Battle of Wenden, Russian casualties were severe with armaments and horses captured, leaving Ivan IV with his first serious defeat in Livonia.

Báthory accelerated the formation of the hussars, a new well-organised cavalry troop that replaced the feudal levy. Similarly, he improved an already effective artillery system and recruited cossacks. Báthory gathered 56,000 troops, 30,000 of them from Lithuania, for his first assault on Russia at Polotsk, as part of a wider campaign. With Ivan's reserves in Pskov and Novgorod to guard against a possible Swedish invasion, the city fell on 30 August 1579. Báthory then appointed a close ally and powerful member of his court, Jan Zamoyski, to lead a force of 48,000, including 25,000 men from Lithuania, against the fortress of Velikie Luki which he went on to capture on 5 September 1580. Without further significant resistance, garrisons such as Sokol, Velizh, and Usvzat fell quickly. In 1581, the force besieged Pskov, a well-fortified and heavily defended fortress. However, financial support from the Polish parliament was dropping, and Báthory failed to lure Russian forces in Livonia out into open field before the onset of winter. Not realising that the Polish–Lithuanian advance was on the wane, Ivan signed the Truce of Jam Zapolski.

The failure of the Swedish siege of Narva in 1579 led to Pontus de la Gardie's appointment as commander-in-chief. The towns of Kexholm and Padise were taken by Swedish forces in 1580, then in 1581, concurrent with the fall of Wesenberg, a mercenary army hired by Sweden recaptured the strategic city of Narva. A target of John III's campaigns, since it could be attacked by both land and sea, the campaign made use of Sweden's considerable fleet but later arguments over formal control in the long term hampered any alliance with Poland. Following la Gardie's taking of the city, and in retaliation for previous Russian massacres, 7,000 Russians were killed according to Russow's contemporary chronicle. The fall of Narva was followed by those of Ivangorod, Jama, and Koporye, leaving Sweden content with its gains in Livonia.

=== Truces of Jam Zapolski and Plussa ===
Division of Livonia by 1600: Poland–Lithuania Vassal duchies of Poland–Lithuania Russia Kingdom of Sweden Denmark-Norway

Subsequent negotiations led by Jesuit papal legate Antonio Possevino resulted in the 1582 Truce of Jam Zapolski between Russia and the Polish–Lithuanian Commonwealth. This was a humiliation for the Tsar, in part because he requested the truce. Under the agreement Russia would surrender all areas in Livonia it still held and the city of Dorpat (Tartu) to the Polish–Lithuanian Commonwealth, while Polotsk would remain under Commonwealth control. Any captured Swedish territory—specifically Narva—could be retained by the Russians and Velike Luki would be returned from Báthory's control to Russia. Possevino made a half-hearted attempt to get John III's wishes taken into consideration, but this was vetoed by the Tsar, probably in collusion with Báthory. The armistice, which fell short of a full peace arrangement, was to last ten years and was renewed twice, in 1591 and 1601. Báthory failed in his attempts to pressure Sweden into relinquishing its gains in Livonia, particularly Narva.

Following a decision by John, the war with Russia ended when the Tsar concluded the Truce of Plussa (Plyussa, Pljussa, Plusa) with Sweden on 10 August 1583. Russia relinquished most of Ingria, leaving Narva and Ivangorod as well under Swedish control. Originally scheduled to last three years, the Russo-Swedish truce was later extended until 1590. During the negotiations, Sweden made vast demands for Russian territory, including Novgorod. Whilst these conditions were probably only for the purposes of negotiation, they may have reflected Swedish aspirations of territory in the region.

== Aftermath ==
The post-war Duchy of Courland and Semigallia south of the Düna (Daugava) river experienced a period of political stability based on the 1561 Treaty of Vilnius, later modified by the 1617 Formula regiminis and Statuta Curlandiæ, which granted indigenous nobles additional rights at the duke's expense. North of the Düna, Báthory reduced the privileges Sigismund had granted the Duchy of Livonia, regarding the regained territories as the spoils of war. Riga's privileges had already been reduced by the Treaty of Drohiczyn in 1581. Polish gradually replaced German as the administrative language and the establishment of voivodeships reduced the Baltic German administration. The local clergy and the Jesuits in Livonia embraced the Counter-Reformation in a process assisted by Báthory, who gave the Roman Catholic Church revenues and estates confiscated from Protestants as well as initiating a largely unsuccessful recruitment campaign for Catholic colonists. Despite these measures, the Livonian population did not convert en masse, while the Livonian estates in Poland–Lithuania were alienated.

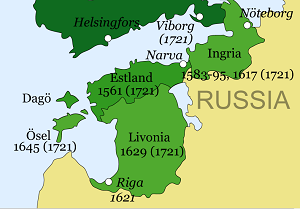
Map showing Sweden in the Baltic, 1560 to 1721. Dates are those of occupation, and those in brackets dates of loss.

In 1590, the Russo-Swedish truce of Plussa expired and fighting resumed while the ensuing Russo-Swedish War of 1590–5 ended with the Treaty of Teusina (Tyavzino, Tyavzin), under which Sweden had to cede Ingria and Kexholm to Russia. The Swedish–Polish alliance began to crumble when the Polish King and Grand Duke of Lithuania Sigismund III, who as son of John III of Sweden (died 1592) and Catherine Jagellonica, was the successor to the Swedish throne, met with resistance from a faction led by his uncle, Charles of Södermanland (later Charles IX), who claimed regency in Sweden for himself. Sweden descended into a civil war in 1597, followed by the 1598–1599 war against Sigismund, which ended with the deposition of Sigismund by the Swedish riksdag.

Local nobles turned to Charles for protection in 1600 when the conflict spread to Livonia, where Sigismund had tried to incorporate Swedish Estonia into the Duchy of Livonia. Charles then expelled the Polish forces from Estonia and invaded the Livonian duchy, starting a series of Polish–Swedish wars. At the same time, Russia was embroiled in civil war over the vacant Russian throne ("Time of Troubles") when none of the many claimants had prevailed. This conflict became intertwined with the Livonian campaigns when Swedish and Polish–Lithuanian forces intervened on opposite sides, the latter starting the Polish–Muscovite War. Charles IX's forces were expelled from Livonia after major setbacks at the battles of Kokenhausen(1601) and Kircholm (1605). During the later Ingrian War, Charles' successor Gustavus Adolphus retook Ingria and Kexholm which were formally ceded to Sweden under the 1617 Treaty of Stolbovo along with the bulk of the Duchy of Livonia. In 1617, when Sweden had recovered from the Kalmar War with Denmark, several Livonian towns were captured, but only Pernau (Pärnu) remained under Swedish control after a Polish–Lithuanian counter-offensive. A second campaign then started with the capture of Riga in 1621 and expelled Polish–Lithuanian forces from most of Livonia, where the dominion of Swedish Livonia was created. Swedish forces then advanced through Royal Prussia and Poland–Lithuania accepted Swedish gains in Livonia in the 1629 Treaty of Altmark.

The Danish province of Øsel was ceded to Sweden under the 1645 Treaty of Brömsebro, which ended the Torstenson War, one theatre of the Thirty Years' War. It was retained after the Peace of Oliva and the Treaty of Copenhagen, both in 1660. The situation remained unchanged until 1710 when Estonia and Livonia capitulated to Russia during the Great Northern War, an action formalised in the Treaty of Nystad (1721).

== See also ==
- Livonians
- Russo-Turkish wars

== Sources ==
- Bain, Robert Nisbet (2006) [1905], Scandinavia: a Political History of Denmark, Norway and Sweden from 1513 to 1900, Boston: Adamant Media Corp., ISBN 0-543-93899-9, archived from the original on 1 October 2023
- Bain, Robert Nisbet (1971) [1908], Slavonic Europe, Cambridge historical, Cambridge: Cambridge University Press, archived from the original on 1 October 2023
- Black, Jeremy (1996), Warfare. Renaissance to revolution, 1492–1792, Cambridge Illustrated Atlases, vol. II, Cambridge: Cambridge University Press, ISBN 0-521-47033-1
- Bülow, Werner (2003), Als die Bayern Bonn eroberten. Aus der Erlebniswelt einer Generation im Europa des 16. Jahrhunderts (in German), Munich: Herbert Utz Verlag, ISBN 3-8316-0244-1
- Cynarski, Stanisław (2007), Žygimantas Augustas (in Lithuanian), Vilnius: Versus aureus, ISBN 978-9955-699-59-0
- Dybaś, Bogusław (2006), "Livland und Polen-Litauen nach dem Frieden von Oliva (1660)", in Willoweit, Dietmar; Lemberg, Hans (eds.), Reiche und Territorien in Ostmitteleuropa. Historische Beziehungen und politische Herrschaftslegitimation, Völker, Staaten und Kulturen in Ostmitteleuropa (in German), vol. 2, Munich: Oldenbourg Wissenschaftsverlag, ISBN 3-486-57839-1
- Dybaś, Bogusław (2009), "Zwischen Warschau und Dünaburg. Die adligen Würdenträger in den livländischen Gebieten der Polnisch-Litauischen Republik", in North, Michael (ed.), Kultureller Austausch: Bilanz und Perspektiven der Frühneuzeitforschung (in German), Köln/Weimar: Böhlau, ISBN 978-3-412-20333-7
- Elliott, John Huxtable (2000), Europe divided, 1559–1598, Blackwell classic histories of Europe (2nd ed.), Hoboken, New Jersey: Wiley-Blackwell, ISBN 978-0-631-21780-0
- Eriksson, Bo (2007), Lützen 1632 (in Swedish), Stockholm: Norstedts Pocket, ISBN 978-91-7263-790-0
- Fischer, Ernst Ludwig; Kirkpatrick, John (1907), The Scots in Sweden; being a contribution towards the history of the Scot abroad, Edinburgh: O. Schulze & Co., OCLC 4730173
- Frost, Robert I. (2000), The Northern Wars: War, State, and Society in Northeastern Europe, 1558–1721, Modern wars in perspective, Upper Saddle River, New Jersey: Pearson Education, ISBN 0-582-06429-5
- Hartmann, Stefan (2005), Herzog Albrecht von Preussen und Livland (1551–1557). Regesten aus dem Herzoglichen Briefarchiv und den Ostpreußischen Folianten (in German), Köln/Weimar: Böhlau, ISBN 3-412-12505-9
- Hübner, Eckhard (1998), "Zwischen alle Fronten: Magnus von Holstein als König von Livland", in Hübner, Eckhard; Klug, Ekkehard; Kusber, Jan (eds.), Zwischen Christianisierung und Europäisierung. Beiträge zur Geschichte Osteuropas in Mittelalter und früher Neuzeit. Festschrift für Peter Nitsche zum 65. Geburtstag, Quellen und Studien zur Geschichte des östlichen Europa (in German), vol. 51, Stuttgart: Steiner, pp. 313–334, ISBN 3-515-07266-7
- Kahle, Wilhelm (1984), "Die Bedeutung der Confessio Augustana für die Kirche im Osten", in Hauptmann, Peter (ed.), Studien zur osteuropäischen Kirchengeschichte und Kirchenkunde, Kirche im Osten (in German), vol. 27, Göttingen: Vandenhoeck & Ruprecht, ISBN 3-525-56382-5
- Kreem, Juhan (2006), "Der Deutsche Orden und die Reformation in Livland", in Mol, Johannes A.; Militzer, Klaus; Nicholson, Helen J. (eds.), The military orders and the Reformation. Choices, state building, and the weight of tradition (in German), Hilversum: Uitgeverij Verloren, ISBN 90-6550-913-5
- Körber, Esther-Beate (1998), Öffentlichkeiten der frühen Neuzeit. Teilnehmer, Formen, Institutionen und Entscheidungen öffentlicher Kommunikation im Herzogtum Preussen von 1525 bis 1618 (in German), Berlin: de Gruyter, ISBN 3-11-015600-8
- Liptai, E. (1984), Magyarország hadtörténete [Military history of Hungary] (in Hungarian), vol. 1, Zrínyi Katonai Kiadó, ISBN 963-326-320-4
- De Madariaga, Isabel (2006), Ivan the Terrible, New Haven, Connecticut: Yale University Press, ISBN 978-0-300-11973-2
- Nordstrom, Byron J. (2000), Scandinavia Since 1500, Minneapolis: University of Minnesota Press, ISBN 978-0-8166-2098-2
- Oakley, Steward (1993), War and peace in the Baltic, 1560–1790, War in Context, Abingdon, New York: Routledge, ISBN 0-415-02472-2
- Pauker, C. J. U. (1854), "Der Ordens-Voigt, nachher Königl. dänischer Statthalter zu Sonneburg, Heinrich von Ludinghausen gen. Wolffund dessen Ansprüche an Sonneburg und dessen Gebiet", in Bunge, F. G. v.; Pauker, C. J. U. (eds.), Archiv für die Geschichte Liv-, Ehst- und Curlands (in German), vol. 7, Reval: Lindsfors Erben
- Peterson, Gary Dean (2007), Warrior kings of Sweden. The rise of an empire in the sixteenth and seventeenth centuries, Jefferson, North Carolina: McFarland, ISBN 978-0-7864-2873-1, archived from the original on 26 July 2023
- Rabe, Horst (1989), Reich und Glaubensspaltung. Deutschland 1500–1600, Neue deutsche Geschichte (in German), vol. 4, Munich: C.H.Beck, ISBN 3-406-30816-3
- Roberts, Michael (1968), The Early Vasas: A History of Sweden, 1523–1611, Cambridge: Cambridge University Press, ISBN 1-00-129698-2, archived from the original on 26 July 2023
- Solovyov, Sergey (1791), History of Russia from the Earliest Times (in Russian), vol. VI, New York: MintRight Inc, ISBN 5-17-002142-9, archived from the original on 26 July 2023
- Steinke, Dimitri (2009), Die Zivilrechtsordnungen des Baltikums unter dem Einfluss ausländischer, insbesondere deutscher Rechtsquellen, Osnabrücker Schriften zur Rechtsgeschichte (in German), vol. 16, Göttingen: Vandenhoeck & Ruprecht, ISBN 978-3-89971-573-6
- Stevens, Carol Belkin (2007), Russia's wars of emergence, 1460–1730, Modern wars in perspective, Upper Saddle River, New Jersey: Pearson Education, ISBN 978-0-582-21891-8, archived from the original on 27 July 2023
- Stone, Daniel (2001), The Polish-Lithuanian state, 1386–1795, History of East Central Europe, vol. 4, Seattle: University of Washington Press, ISBN 0-295-98093-1, archived from the original on 26 July 2023
- Tuchtenhagen, Ralph (2005), Geschichte der baltischen Länder, Beck'sche Reihe (in German), vol. 2355, Munich: C.H.Beck, ISBN 3-406-50855-3
- Wernham, Richard Bruce (1968), The new Cambridge modern history: The Counter-Reformation and price revolution, 1559–1610, Cambridge: Cambridge University Press Archive, ISBN 0-521-04543-6
- "Ливония" . Brockhaus and Efron Encyclopedic Dictionary (in Russian). 1906.
- "Иоанн IV Васильевич" . Brockhaus and Efron Encyclopedic Dictionary (in Russian). 1906.
