= Treaty of Novgorod (1537) =

1537 treaty between Moscow and Sweden

The Treaty of Novgorod, signed in 1537 between the Grand Principality of Moscow and the Kingdom of Sweden, was a truce set to expire in 60 years. The truce lasted until the outbreak of the Russo-Swedish War (1554–1557), which was ended by the Treaty of Novgorod (1557), in a truce set likewise to expire in 1597.

== Sources ==
- Scott, Franklin Daniel (1988). Sweden, the nation's history. SIU Press. ISBN 0-8093-1489-4.
