= Russo-Swedish War (1554–1557) =

War between Sweden and the Tsardom of Russia

Russo-Swedish War of 1554–1557
- Part of a series of Russo-Swedish wars
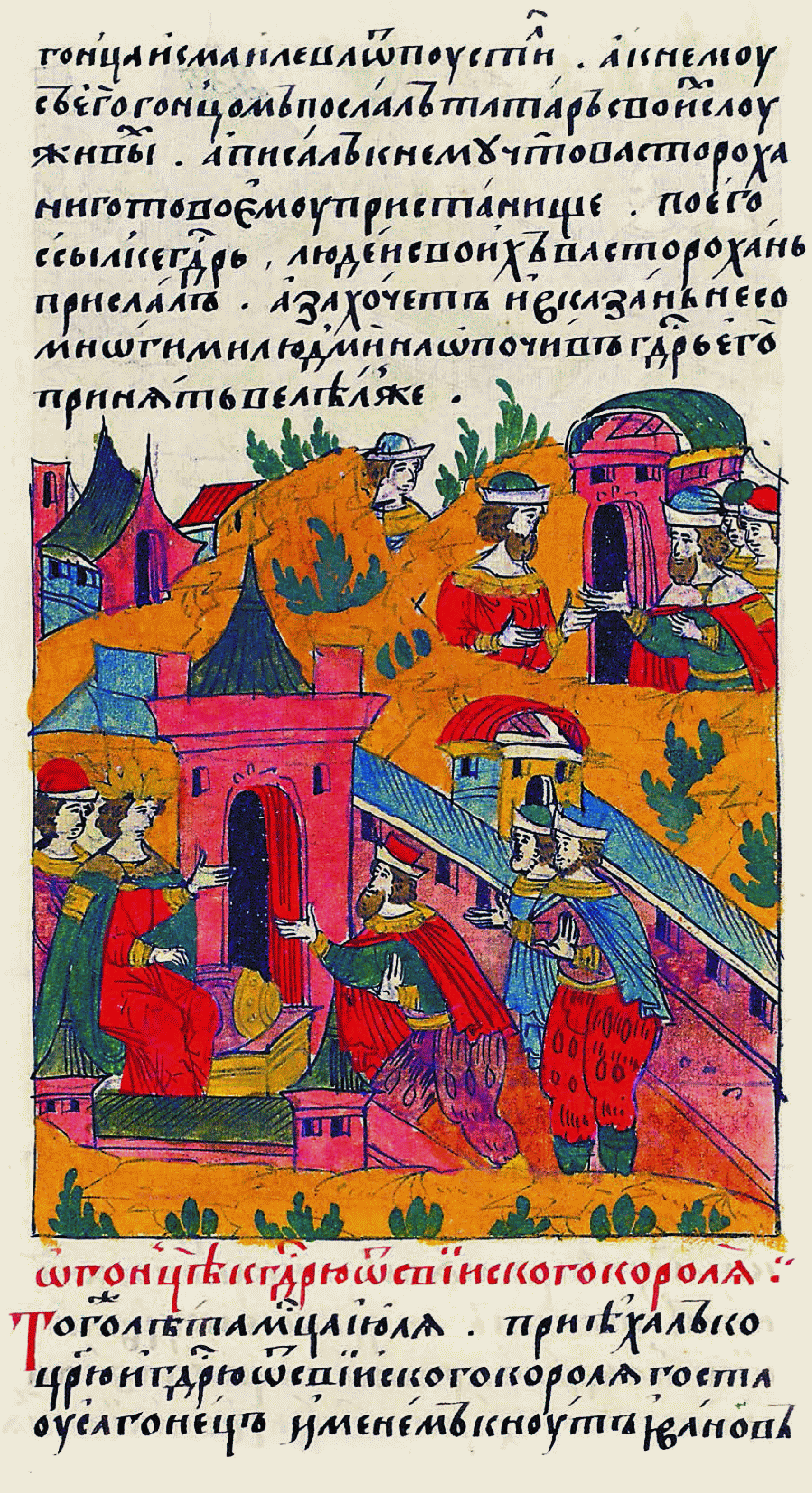
- Ivan IV receives a messenger from king Gustav I of Sweden.
Date	1554–1557
Location	Karelia
Result	Inconclusive

Belligerents
Tsardom of Russia	Sweden

Commanders and leaders
Ivan IV	(Sweden) Gustav I

The Russo-Swedish War of 1554–1557, considered a prelude to the Livonian War of 1558–1583, arose out of border skirmishes. It ended when the parties agreed on a truce in the Treaty of Novgorod (1557). The war ended inconclusively.

== Prelude ==
Relations between Sweden and Russia were tense. Ivan IV of Russia did not consider Swedish King Gustav I his equal and refused to negotiate with Swedish ambassadors in person. Ivan made the king's ambassadors confer with a governor of Novgorod, rather than receive them in the Moscow Kremlin, as could have been expected between equals. The tsar responded to Gustav's remonstrances: "Ask your merchants and they will tell you that Novgorod's suburbs are larger than your Stockholm and that Novgorod's governors are descended from sovereign rulers of great empires, whereas your parents sold oxen at a market several decades ago".

Despite the tense relations between the two regents, a state of peace was the general situation during most of Gustav's reign, as agreed on in the Treaty of Novgorod (1537). However, both the Russians and the Swedes frequently crossed the border to plunder.

== War ==
In 1554 the Pechenga Monastery was raided by the Swedes. The governor of Novgorod, Paletsky, sent Nikita Kuzmin to Stockholm to ask for an explanation, but the Russian representative was imprisoned. In response, Russia mounted an organised attack with up to 20,000 soldiers in March 1555. With an initial force of 1,000 men, Finland could not stand against the invading troops, but reinforcements of 3,700 infantrymen and 250 cavalrymen soon arrived from Sweden. The Finnish nobility had also been engaged in the war by contributing with its cavalry.

The goal of the Swedish-Finnish troops was to conquer Oreshek, Korela and Koporye. The siege of Oreshek had been badly planned by the Swedish and failed since the Russians had destroyed the areas surrounding the town, and the Swedish troops had too few supplies to be able to maintain the siege until the town surrendered. While Admiral Johan Brigge besieged and bombarded Oreshek, the Swedish diplomats tried to find support for their cause in Livonia, Poland-Lithuania and England.

In early 1556, Russia launched a new attack, now with an army of almost 20,000 men. The attack was aimed at the town of Viborg (Russian: Vyborg), and the Swedish troops were unlikely to withstand an army of such a size. However, after a few days of pillaging in the area around Viborg, the Russian forces retreated. The reason remains unclear, but conceivable reasons include bad discipline or a raging disease amongst the Russian soldiers. Perhaps it was never the aim to conquer Viborg but only to ravage the areas around the town as a demonstration of power. Russian orders, however, did not contain any mention that Viborg was to be taken, on the contrary, documents containing the order to "burn and plunder" were found in the possession of the Russian prisoners. The campaign ended in success, and the Russians, according to the Nikon Chronicle, "returned mostly healthy."

== Conclusion ==
During the summer of 1556, Swedish attempts to achieve peace with Russia were made. Peace negotiations were scheduled to begin later the same year, and in March 1557, a peace treaty was signed. The treaty preserved the status quo and accorded free passage across the border to merchants of both countries. In order to conclude peace, Archbishop of Uppsala, Bishop of Åbo (Turku), Sten Erikson, and Olof Larson arrived to Moscow, where they dwelt in the Lithuanian Embassy for several months and were frequently summoned to the Kremlin to discuss with the tsar matters of religious doctrine.

== See also ==
- List of wars involving Russia
- List of wars involving Sweden
