= Treaty of Vilnius (1561) =

1561 transfer of territory from the Livonian Confederation to the Grand Duchy of Lithuania

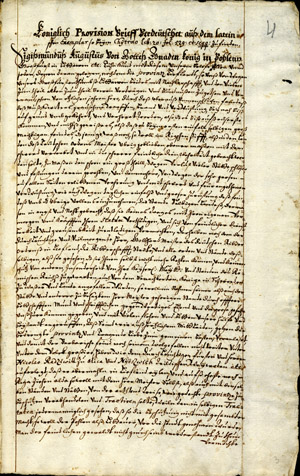
German translation of the Pacta subiectionis.

The Treaty of Vilnius was concluded on 28 November 1561, during the Livonian War, between the Livonian Confederation and the Grand Duchy of Lithuania in Vilnius. With the treaty, the non-Danish and non-Swedish part of Livonia, with the exception of the Free imperial city of Riga, subjected itself to the Grand Duke of Lithuania, Sigismund II Augustus with the Pacta subiectionis (Provisio ducalis). In turn, Sigismund granted protection from the Tsardom of Russia and confirmed the Livonian estates' traditional privileges, laid out in the Privilegium Sigismundi Augusti.

The secularization of the Livonian Order was the "final act" in Livonia's transition from the Middle Ages to the Early Modern era. The territories were re-organized in the Duchy of Courland and Semigallia and the Duchy of Livonia, the latter competing with the Kingdom of Livonia during the war. After its reconquest, Sigismund's successor Stephen Báthory ignored the privileges of 1561, granted a new constitution and initiated Counter-Reformation. These measures were reversed after the Swedish conquest. When after a further series of wars Livonia capitulated to Russia in 1710, the Privilegium Sigismundi Augusti was confirmed by Peter the Great.

== Background ==
In 1513, the Grand Master of the Livonian Order bought his order out of the union with the Teutonic Knights. Thus, the secularization of the Teutonic Order State, which led to the establishment of the Protestant Duchy of Prussia under the Polish king in 1525, did not affect Livonia, where the Recess of Wolmar (Valmiera) forbade any future secularization in 1546. The Protestant Reformation had started in Riga in 1517, and afterward it had spread to all of Livonia; religious freedom was declared in 1554.

Livonian Confederation

As the Livonian Confederation was in decline due to internal struggles, a faction of the order favored rapprochement with Poland–Lithuania, while another faction violently opposed it. After a civil war starting in 1556, the pro-Polish faction gained the upper hand.

With the Treaty of Pozvol, concluded in 1557, the Livonian Confederation had turned to Poland–Lithuania for protection, triggering Ivan IV of Russia's intervention in what was to become the Livonian War. In 1558, Ivan IV had conquered the Dorpat (Tartu) area, annihilating the Bishopric of Dorpat. With the Treaty of Vilnius of 31 August 1559, Gotthard von Kettler, Grand Master of the Livonian Order, had put the order's lands under protection of Polish king and Grand Duke of Lithuania, Sigismund II Augustus. The order ceded about one seventh of its territory, allowed Sigismund to garrison its most important castles, and agreed to share with him any conquests made from Ivan IV. The alliance was intended to neutralize the imminent threat of annexation of the order's lands by Russia, yet despite earning military support from Polish-Lithuanian chancellor Mikołaj "the Black" Radziwiłł, Kettler was defeated in Ērģeme (Ermes, 1560) and unable to prevent the occupation of most of Livonia by Russian forces. After the treaty, the disintegrating order agreed to secularization if necessary, and since Sigismund was reluctant to support it militarily, continued its search for a protector at the courts of Denmark-Norway and the Holy Roman Emperor.

In 1560, Johann von Münchhausen sold his bishoprics of Ösel-Wiek and Courland to Magnus, brother of Danish king Frederick II. In June 1561, part of Estonia subordinated itself to Sweden. Riga had turned to the Holy Roman Empire and became a Free imperial city. Hard-pressed by Ivan IV of Russia, the remnant of the Livonian Confederation concluded a treaty with Poland–Lithuania on 28 November 1561, subordinating themselves to the Sigismund II Augustus.

== Treaty ==
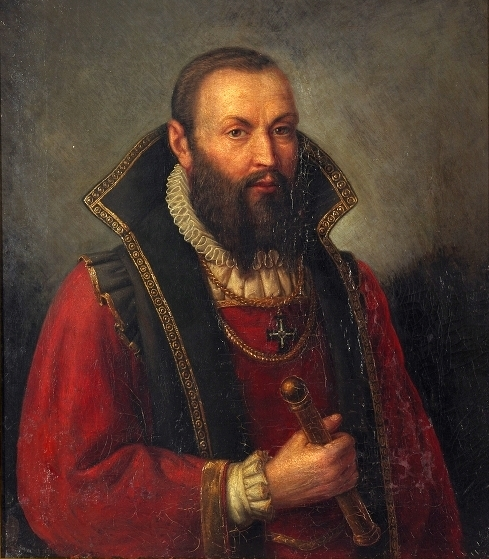
Gotthard Kettler

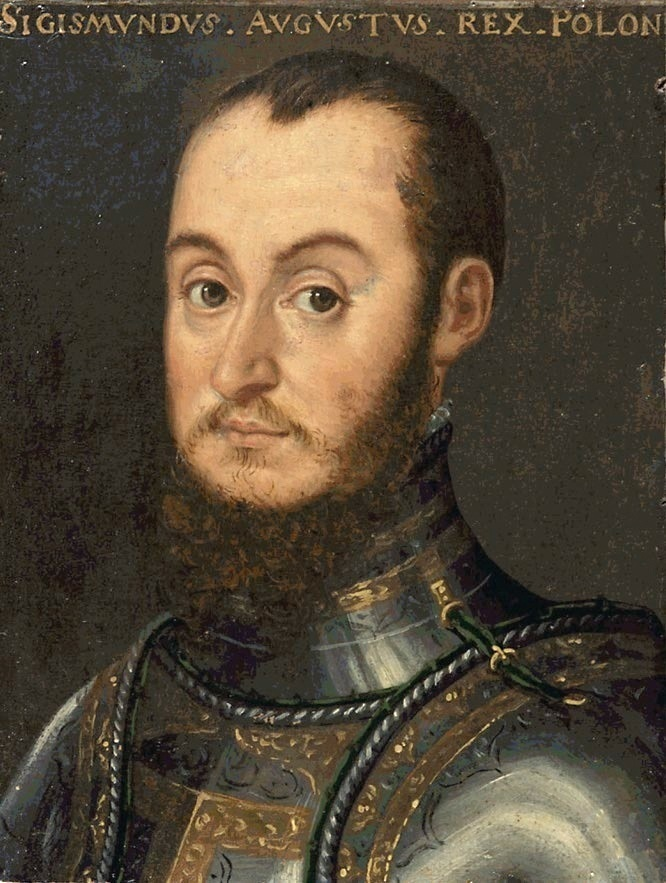
Sigismund II Augustus

In November 1561 the new Grand Master Gotthard Kettler secularized the Order and surrendered Livonia to Sigismund Augustus, retaining the Duchy of Courland for himself as Polish-Lithuanian vassal. The Northern Crusade was over, the Northern Wars had begun.

— Frost, Robert I.: The Northern Wars, Harlow 2000, p. 5.

The treaty comprised the Pacta subiectionis by which the Livonian estates accepted Polish-Lithuanian superiority. This document is also known as Provisio ducalis.

Also included was the Privilegium Sigismundi Augusti by which Sigismund II Augustus guaranteed the Livonian estates several privileges, including religious freedom with respect to the Augsburg Confession, the Indigenat (Polish: Indygenat), and continuation of the traditional German jurisdiction and administration. The terms regarding religious freedom forbade any regulation of the traditional Protestant order by religious or secular authorities, and ruled that cases of disagreements be judged only by Protestant scholars.

The Livonian regions south of the Daugava River (Düna, Dvina), comprising Courland (Kurland) and Semigallia (Semgallen, Zemgale, Žiemgala), were established as the secular Duchy of Courland and Semigallia with Gotthard von Kettler as its duke. Shaped after the Prussian model, Courland and Semigallia was thus made a hereditary fief of the Grand Duke of Lithuania, later of the Polish Crown.

In contrast, Livonia north of the Daugava was subordinated directly to Sigismund II Augustus as Duchy of Livonia, also referred to as Livonia transdunensis, with Kettler installed as Sigismund's "Royal administrator". These territories however excluded Riga, then a Free imperial city of the Holy Roman Empire, part of Estonia with Reval (Tallinn), which was under Swedish protection, and the westernmost part of Estonia with Øsel (Ösel, Saaremaa), which was Danish.

== Consequences ==
In the Duchy of Courland and Semigallia, a stable political system was established on the basis of the 1561 treaty, and only in 1617 this was modified by the Formula regiminis and Statuta Curlandiæ, which granted the indigenous nobles additional rights at the duke's expense.

The situation north of the Daugava was quite different. On 25 December 1566, the Union of Grodno established a real union between the Duchy of Livonia the Grand Duchy of Lithuania, Livonia's administrative division was re-organized with its castellans becoming members of the Lithuanian senate. The union however did not impact Livonian jurisdiction, which was to be carried out according to the traditional customs. When in 1569 the Union of Lublin transformed the Polish-Lithuanian personal union into a real union, the Polish–Lithuanian Commonwealth, Livonia became a Polish-Lithuanian condominium. Ivan IV of Russia subdued nearly all of Livonia transdunanesis between 1572 and 1577. Magnus, in addition to his Livonian possessions, bought the succession in the Bishopric of Reval and established the Kingdom of Livonia under Ivan IV's patronage. After the Polish-Swedish victory in the Battle of Wenden (1578), Russian forces were subsequently expelled from Livonia, and the Livonian War ended with the treaties of Jam Zapolski and Narva-Plyussa. Only then, Sigismund's successor Stephen Báthory (Batory) was able to re-assume control over the Duchy of Livonia.

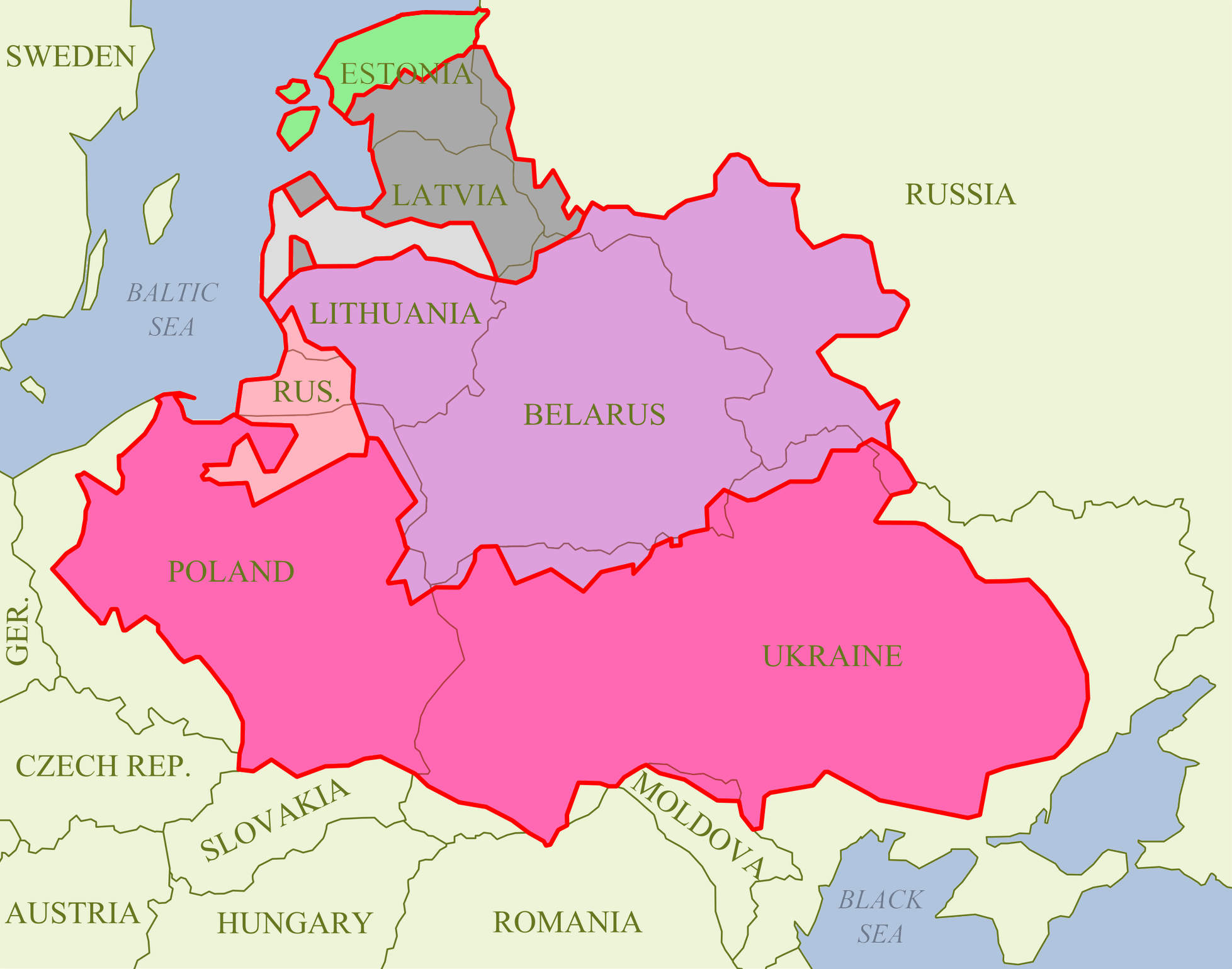
Polish–Lithuanian Commonwealth superimposed on modern borders, Duchy of Livonia shown in dark grey, Duchy of Courland and Semigallia in light grey, Grand Duchy of Lithuania in purple, Swedish Estonia and Danish Øsel in green.

Báthory however regarded the re-conquered territories as his war booty, refused to confirm the Privilegium Sigismundi Augusti, and in 1582 replaced it with the Constitutiones Livoniae, which tolerated Indigenat and Augsburg Confession, but revoked their status as elementary right and else did not contain any privileges. The traditional German administration and jurisdiction was gradually impaired by the establishment of voivodeships, the appointment of Royal officials, and the replacement of German with Polish as administrative language. Riga was added to Polish-Lithuanian Livonia by the Treaty of Drohiczyn of 14 January 1581, including a Corpus Privilegiorum Stephanorum similarly reducing its freedoms.

Under Stephen Báthory, the Duchy of Livonia was subjected to Counter-Reformation led by bishop Otto von Schenking, who had converted to Catholicism, and the Jesuits of Riga and Dorpat (Tartu). The respective Jesuit colleges and the Catholic bishopric with its see in Wenden (Cēsis) were founded in 1566. Counter-reformation focussed on the Latvian and Estonian population, since they were not explicitly mentioned in the Privilegium Sigismundi Augusti - a disputed interpretation since the German Livonian estates traditionally spoke for all Livonians. Lutherans were forbidden to preach in Estonian, Latvian and Russian language, while at the same time Catholic documents were published in these languages. Stephen Batory participated in the Counter-Reformation by granting revenues and estates confiscated from Protestants to the Catholic Church and by initiating a (largely unsuccessful) recruitment campaign for Catholic colonists.

These measures however proved to have only limited impact on the Estonian and Latvian population, while alienating the German gentry to a degree that they supported the Swedish take-over of Livonia (without Latgalia, Courland and Semigallia), formalized in the treaties of Altmark (1629) and Stuhmsdorf (1635). The Polish–Swedish wars had begun in 1600, when Catholic Sigismund III Vasa tried to incorporate Protestant Swedish Estonia into the Polish-Lithuanian Duchy of Livonia, whereupon the local nobles turned to the duke of Södermanland and later Swedish king, Charles IX for protection. Charles IX expelled the Polish forces from Estonia, and his campaigns in the Duchy of Livonia were concluded in 1621 by his successor Gustavus Adolphus, who established the dominion of Swedish Livonia from the bulk of the Duchy of Livonia.

Swedish rule ended the Counter-Reformation, and the privileges of the Livonian nobles resembled those outlined in the Privilegium Sigismundi Augusti. When in 1710 Estonia and Livonia capitulated to Russia during the Great Northern War, the capitulations explicitly referred to the Privilegium Sigismundi Augusti, with the respective references being confirmed in the Treaty of Nystad (1721).

== Sources ==
=== Bibliography ===
- Bülow, Werner (2003). Als die Bayern Bonn eroberten (in German). Utz. ISBN 3-8316-0244-1.
- De Madariaga, Isabel (2006). Ivan the Terrible. Yale University Press. ISBN 0-300-11973-9.
- Dybaś, Bogusław (2006). "Livland und Polen-Litauen nach dem Frieden von Oliva (1660)". In Willoweit, Dietmar; Lemberg, Hans (eds.). Reiche und Territorien in Ostmitteleuropa. Historische Beziehungen und politische Herrschaftslegitimation. Völker, Staaten und Kulturen in Ostmitteleuropa (in German). Vol. 2. Munich: Oldenbourg Wissenschaftsverlag. pp. 51–72. ISBN 3-486-57839-1.
- Frost, Robert I (2000). The Northern Wars. War, State and Society in Northeastern Europe 1558-1721. Harlow: Longman. ISBN 978-0-582-06429-4.
- Grudulis, Ludwig (1998). "The Reformation and Public Education in 16th and 17th Century Latvia". In Golz, Reinhard; Mayrhofer, Wolfgang (eds.). Luther and Melanchthon in the educational thought of central and eastern Europe. Texts on Theory and History of Education. Vol. 10. LIT. ISBN 3-8258-3490-5.
- Kahle, Wilhelm (1984). "Die Bedeutung der Confessio Augustana für die Kirche im Osten". In Hauptmann, Peter (ed.). Studien zur osteuropäischen Kirchengeschichte und Kirchenkunde. Kirche im Osten (in German). Vol. 27. Vandenhoeck & Ruprecht. pp. 9–35. ISBN 3-525-56382-5.
- Rabe, Horst (1989). Reich und Glaubensspaltung. Deutschland 1500-1600. Neue deutsche Geschichte (in German). Vol. 4. C.H.Beck. ISBN 3-406-30816-3.
- Roberts, Michael (1986). The early Vasas. A history of Sweden 1523-1611. CUP Archive. ISBN 0-521-31182-9.
- Sahanowitsch, Henads (2001). "Der Eintritt des Großfürstentum Litauens in die polnische Adelsrepublik. Weißrußland im 16. und 17. Jahrhundert". In Beyrau, Dietrich; Lindener, Rainer (eds.). Handbuch der Geschichte Weissrusslands (in German). Vandenhoeck & Ruprecht. ISBN 3-525-36255-2.
- Steinke, Dimitri (2009). Die Zivilrechtsordnungen des Baltikums unter dem Einfluss ausländischer, insbesondere deutscher Rechtsquellen. Osnabrücker Schriften zur Rechtsgeschichte (in German). Vol. 16. Vandenhoeck & Ruprecht. ISBN 978-3-89971-573-6.
- Tuchtenhagen, Ralph (2005). Geschichte der baltischen Länder. Beck'sche Reihe (in German). Vol. 2355. C.H.Beck. ISBN 3-406-50855-3.
