= Privilegium Sigismundi Augusti =

Legal provision in the 1561 Treaty of Vilnius

Privilegium Sigismundi Augusti was established on 28 November 1561 in the Treaty of Vilnius between the Polish King and Lithuanian Grand Duke Sigismund II Augustus and the last Landmeister in Livonia Gotthard Kettler, contractually negotiated and granted privilege, which sets the ratio of the Livland Estates Order on the Polish crown and sealed the end of the Teutonic Order and the Livonian Confederation. For the Duchy of Courland and Semigallia the Pacta Subiectionis was additionally signed, which in addition to the privileges governed the relationship of the nobility to the duke, the Polish king and the Reichstag.

== The privileges ==
Gotthard Kettler was the last national champion of the Livonian Order. He subordinated himself to the remains of the Order and its vassals Poland-Lithuania. After negotiations with King Sigismund Augustus, he granted the Livonian nobility and Courland nobility special rights:

1. Guarantee of the Evangelical-Lutheran faith
2. Guarantee of the official German language
3. Guarantee of self-government ("German authorities", "German law")
4. Codification of (Livonian) land law
5. Assurances of the indigenous people (offices in Livonia and Courland only to locals).

The autonomy rights set in this form served the German upper class also with later changes of rule as basis for negotiations and retained essentially up to the year 1919 (Imperial Russian Baltic governorate Livland) their validity.

== Literature ==
- Burchard von Klot: Jost Clodt and the privilege Sigismundi Augusti. Harro Hirschheydt, Hanover 1977, ISBN 3-7777-0826-7 ( Contributions to the Baltic History , Vol. 6).
