= Union of Grodno (1566) =

1566 real union between Lithuania and Livonia

The Union of Grodno established a real union between the Grand Duchy of Lithuania and the Duchy of Livonia on 25 December 1566, during the Livonian War. Livonia had submitted itself to Sigismund II Augustus by the Treaty of Vilnius (1561). Livonia's administrative division was re-organized with its castellans becoming members of the Lithuanian senate. The union did not impact Livonian jurisdiction, which was to be carried out according to its traditional customs.

== Sources ==
- Dybaś, Bogusław (2006). "Livland und Polen-Litauen nach dem Frieden von Oliva (1660)". In Willoweit, Dietmar; Lemberg, Hans (eds.). Reiche und Territorien in Ostmitteleuropa. Historische Beziehungen und politische Herrschaftslegitimation. Völker, Staaten und Kulturen in Ostmitteleuropa (in German). Vol. 2. Munich: Oldenbourg Wissenschaftsverlag. pp. 51–72. ISBN 3-486-57839-1.
- Steinke, Dimitri (2009). Die Zivilrechtsordnungen des Baltikums unter dem Einfluss ausländischer, insbesondere deutscher Rechtsquellen. Osnabrücker Schriften zur Rechtsgeschichte (in German). Vol. 16. Vandenhoeck & Ruprecht. pp. 120–121. ISBN 978-3-89971-573-6.
