= Treaty of Vilnius (1559) =

1559 treaty between the Livonian Order and the Grand Duchy of Lithuania

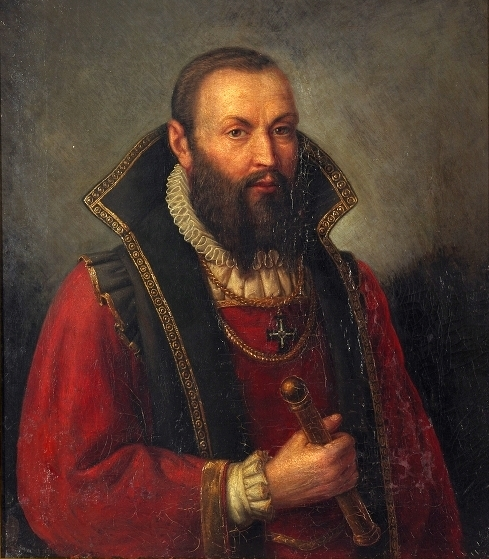
Gotthard von Kettler

The Treaty of Vilnius or Vilna was a treaty signed at Vilnius on 31 August 1559 (during the Livonian War) between the Livonian Order and the Grand Duchy of Lithuania. Gotthard von Kettler, the Master of the Livonian Order, put its lands under the protection of Sigismund II Augustus, the King of Poland and Grand Duke of Lithuania. While the alliance was intended to neutralize the Tsardom of Russia's threat to annex the Order's lands and earned military support from Grand Lithuanian Chancellor Mikołaj "the Black" Radziwiłł, Kettler was ultimately unable to prevent Russian forces from occupying most of Livonia. Thus, Kettler signed a second treaty with Poland-Lithuania on 28 November 1561, transferring the remnants of the Teutonic Order State to the Polish Crown and the Grand Duchy of Lithuania, himself becoming a vassal of Sigismund II Augustus.
