= Treaty of Dorpat =

1564 treaty between Russia and Sweden

The Treaty of Dorpat (Tartu) was concluded in May 1564, during the Livonian War. Ivan IV of Russia accepted the subordinance of Reval (Tallinn) and some Livonian castles to Erik XIV of Sweden, and in turn Erik XIV accepted the subordinance of the rest of Livonia to Ivan IV. Subsequently, Russia and Sweden agreed on a seven-years' truce.
