= Treaty of Plussa =

1583 peace treaty between Russia and Sweden

The Treaty or Truce of Plussa, Pljussa, Plyussa or Narva and Plusa (Russian: Плюсское перемирие, Swedish: Stilleståndsfördrag vid Narva å och Plusa) was a truce between Russia and Sweden, which ended the Livonian War (1558–1583). The truce was signed on 10 August 1583 at the Plyussa River north of the city of Pskov. The truce was set to expire in 1586, but was extended in 1585–1586.

According to the truce, Sweden kept the annexed Russian towns of Ivangorod (Ivanslott), Jamburg, Koporye (Kaprio) and Korela (Kexholm/Käkisalmi) with their uyezds, holding control over Ingria. Russia kept a narrow passage to the Baltic Sea at the estuary of the Neva River, between Strelka and Sestra Rivers.

Upon the expiration of the truce in 1590, Russia resumed the war against Sweden. In 1593, Russia and Sweden resumed peace negotiations, which would last for two years. Finally, the two countries signed the 1595 Treaty of Teusina (Tyavzino).

The aftermath was Sweden annexing northern Livonia.

== See also ==
- Swedish Ingria
- List of treaties

== Sources ==
- Hösch, Edgar (1996). Geschichte Russlands. Vom Kiever Reich bis zum Zerfall des Sowjetimperiums (in German). Kohlhammer Verlag. p. 99. ISBN 3-17-011322-4.
- Perrie, Maureen (2002). Pretenders and Popular Monarchism in Early Modern Russia. The False Tsars of the Time and Troubles. Cambridge University Press. p. 24. ISBN 0-521-89101-9.
