= Treaty of Mozhaysk =

1562 treaty between Denmark and Russia

The Treaty of Mozhaysk (also Moshaisk or other transliterations of Можайск) was a Danish-Russian treaty concluded on 7 August 1562, during the Livonian War. While not an actual alliance, the treaty confirmed the amicable Dano-Russian relation and obliged the parties to not support the other parties in the war, to respect each other's claims in Old Livonia, and to grant free passage to each other's merchants.

By 1562, Frederick II of Denmark-Norway and Ivan IV of Russia were two of several parties claiming superiority rights in Livonia, none of whom was able to decide the conflict for themselves. Instead of engaging in open war, Frederick II and Ivan IV preferred to uphold the long tradition of amicable Dano-Russian relations. The treaty has been noted for the circumstances that a European great power met the Russian tsardom on equal footing, and that no prior military decision forced the parties to conclude it.

In practice, the treaty was not wholly implemented. This was in part due to Frederick II's limited engagement in Livonia, where his brother Magnus pursued his own policies. In the subsequent war years, while not antagonizing Frederick II, Ivan IV would deal with Magnus directly, eventually making him king of Livonia as his vassal.

== Livonia in 1562 ==
In 1562, during the early stage of the Livonian War, the territory of the present-day states Estonia and Latvia (then Terra Mariana or Old Livonia) was contested between Sigismund II Augustus of Poland–Lithuania, Ivan IV "The Terrible", tsar of Russia, Frederick II of Denmark-Norway and Erik XIV of Sweden. The Livonian Confederation had turned to Poland-Lithuania for protection in the 1557 Treaty of Pozvol, provoking the intervention of Ivan IV who, despite significant territorial gains and the important victory at Ermes (Ergeme), was unable to subordinate all Livonia. The bulk of the disintegrating Livonian Confederation was subordinated to Poland-Lithuania in the Treaty of Vilnius (1561), forming the duchies of Livonia and Courland and Semigallia. With Reval (Tallinn) accepting Swedish superiority, also in 1561, Sweden had established a dominion in Estonia despite the protests of Frederick II, who claimed historical rights on the area and had already purchased the Bishopric of Ösel–Wiek in western Estonia.

Robert I. Frost has summarized the 1562 state of war as an "uneasy stalemate:" while Denmark-Norway, Sweden, Russia and Poland-Lithuania had staked overlapping claims, the local parties of the broken-up Livonian Confederation had at least preliminarily chosen sides and intense fighting had occurred between some of the respective armies, a stable solution was not in sight even if military engagements had waned.

== Interests of Frederick II, Ivan IV and Magnus ==
Frederick II focussed on his competition with Erik XIV of Sweden for hegemony in and around the Baltic Sea, which in 1563 culminated into the Northern Seven Years' War. He had no ambitions to enter a conflict with Ivan IV of Russia, and despite a brief irritation in the context of Christian III's occupation of Ösel (Øsel, Saaremaa) in 1558, Dano-Russian relations were amicable and based on a mutual assistance pact of 1493, renewed in 1506 and 1517. Ivan IV likewise did not wish a conflict with Frederick II, as he was unable to reach an understanding with the other parties in the Livonian war, Sweden and Poland-Lithuania, and was pressed by Crimean Tartar invasions at his tsardom's southern frontier.

Frederick II had an uneasy relation to his younger brother Magnus, Duke of Holstein, whom he established in Ösel–Wiek "to be rid" of him. Yet, after Magnus arrived in April 1560, he immediately started to expand by purchasing the Courlandian Stift Pilten (Piltene) and the Estonian bishopric of Reval, and thus by 1561 found himself bankrupt, in conflict with the other parties claiming these territories for themselves, and without any sufficient military means. Magnus turned to his brother's court in Copenhagen hoping that Frederick II would abandon his policy of minimal involvement and enter the Livonian conflict on his side. Yet, Frederick II instead restricted Magnus to not conclude treaties without his consent anymore, obliged him to consolidate his finances by himself and assigned a governor for Ösel–Wiek who was to closely monitor Magnus' activities in Livonia.

== Treaty ==
On 6 July 1562, a group of Danish envoys arrived at Ivan IV's court in Moscow. The delegation was headed by Frederick II's hofmeister Eiler (also Eller, Elias) Hardenberg, and further included Jacob Brokenhusen, Jens Truelsen Ulfstand and Zacharias Vheling. Negotiations lasted only a month, and the treaty was concluded on 7 August in Mozhaysk (Можайск) west of Moscow.

While the treaty did not contain a new mutual aid pact,

- Frederick II and Ivan IV agreed that neither one would support either Sweden or Poland-Lithuania,
- both sides acknowledged and confirmed each other's spheres of interest in Livonia,
- Ivan IV guaranteed Magnus of Holstein his Livonian possessions, and
- merchants from Denmark-Norway and the Russian Tsardom were allowed free passage in both realms.

The treaty did not contain an expiry date.

== Significance ==
In historiography, the Mozhaysk agreements are regarded as a highly significant treaty. Hübner (1998) says that

"the high significance of this treaty, which has been called a 'milestone in European history,' for the Muscovite state was not only due to its contents, but also because a European great power was ready to conclude it on the basis of a completely equal status, without a prior military conflict forcing the parties to do so."

However, the parties were unable to draw practical advantages from the treaty. Neither party was able to prevent Swedish forces from intruding and occupying part of their Livonian claims, the Danish and Polish kings agreed on mutual support against Sweden in the Northern Seven Years' War. Ivan IV delayed the implementation of the free trade agreements and concluded a seven-year truce with Sweden in 1564. In the following years, Ivan IV focussed on Magnus of Holstein rather than Frederick II, establishing him as the king of Livonia under his vassalage.

== Sources ==
=== Bibliography ===
- De Madariaga, Isabel (2006). Ivan the Terrible. Yale University Press. ISBN 0-300-11973-9.
- Frost, Robert I (2000). The Northern Wars: War, State, and Society in Northeastern Europe, 1558–1721. Modern wars in perspective. Upper Saddle River, New Jersey: Pearson Education. ISBN 0-582-06429-5.
- Hübner, Eckhard (1998). "Zwischen alle Fronten: Magnus von Holstein als König von Livland". In Hübner, Eckhard; Klug, Ekkehard; Kusber, Jan (eds.). Zwischen Christianisierung und Europäisierung. Beiträge zur Geschichte Osteuropas in Mittelalter und früher Neuzeit. Festschrift für Peter Nitsche zum 65. Geburtstag. Quellen und Studien zur Geschichte des östlichen Europa (in German). Vol. 51. Stuttgart: Steiner. pp. 313–34. ISBN 3-515-07266-7.
- von Adelung, Friedrich (1846). Kritisch-literärische Übersicht der Reisenden in Russland bis 1700, deren Berichte bekannt sind (in German). Vol. 1. Saint Petersburg: Eggers.
