= Livonia =

Historic region along the eastern shores of the Baltic Sea

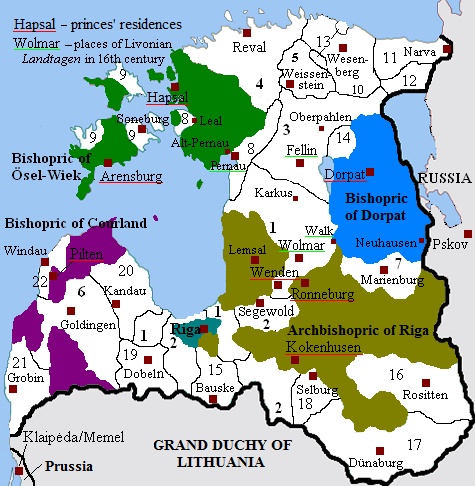
Old Livonia in 1534. State of the Teutonic Order Bishopric of Courland Bishopric of Ösel–Wiek Bishopric of Dorpat Free Imperial City of Riga Archbishopric of Riga

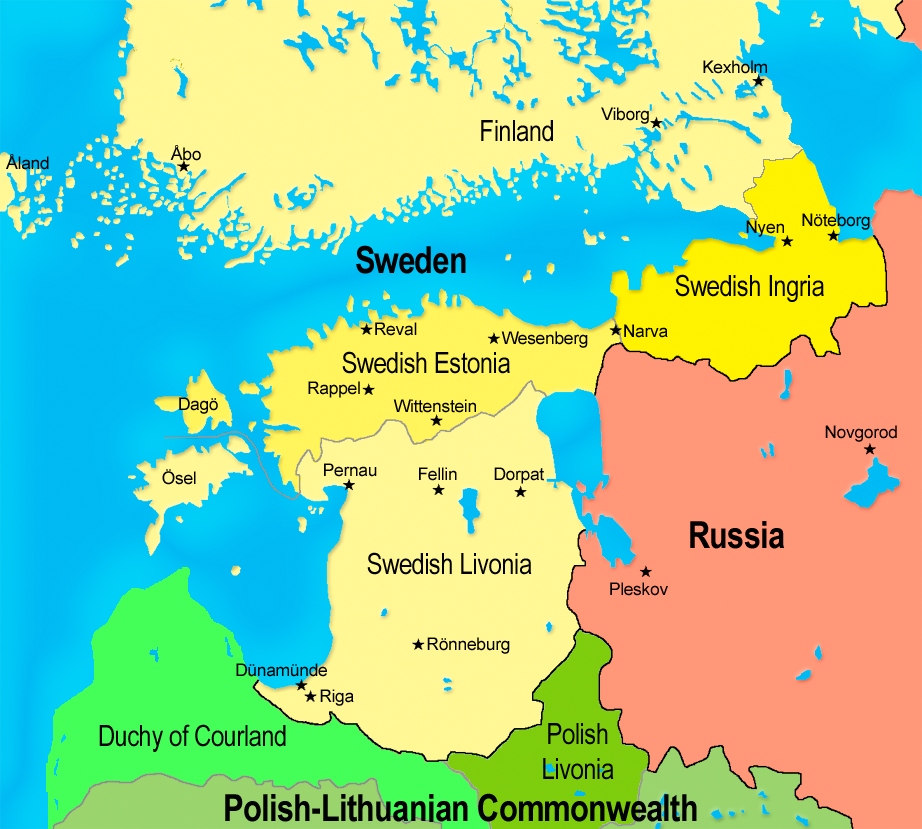
Swedish Livonia, between Swedish Estonia and Courland (1600s)

Livonia, (Note: /lɪˈvoʊniə/ liv-OH-nee-ə – from Latin Livonia; Estonian Liivimaa; Livonian: Līvõmō; Latvian and Lithuanian: Livonija; Polish: Inflanty) known in earlier records as Livland, (Note: /ˈlɪvlənd/ LIV-lənd; German: Livland, Liefland or Eifland; Norwegian, Danish and Swedish: Livland; Icelandic: Lífland; Dutch: Lijfland) is a historical region on the present-day land of Latvia and Estonia. It is named after the historical Livonians, who lived on the shores of present-day Latvia.

By the end of the 13th century, the name was extended to most of present-day Estonia and Latvia, which the Livonian Brothers of the Sword had conquered during the Livonian Crusade (1193–1290). Medieval Livonia, or Terra Mariana, reached its greatest extent after the Saint George's Night Uprising (1343–1345), which forced Denmark to sell the Duchy of Estonia (northern Estonia conquered by Denmark in the 13th century) to the State of the Teutonic Order in 1346. Livonia, as understood after the retreat of Denmark in 1346, bordered on the Gulf of Finland in the north, Lake Peipus and Russia to the east, and Lithuania to the south.

As a consequence of the Livonian War (1558–1583), the territory of Livonia was reduced to the southern half of Estonia and the northern half of Latvia. The indigenous inhabitants of Livonia were various Finnic tribes in the north and Baltic tribes in the south. The descendants of the crusaders formed the nucleus of the new ruling class of Livonia after the Livonian Crusade, and they eventually became known as Baltic Germans.

== History ==
Baltic tribes, c. 1200.

Beginning in the 12th century, Livonia became a target for economic and political expansion by Danes and Germans, particularly for the Hanseatic League and the Cistercian Order. Around 1160, Hanseatic traders from Lübeck established a trading post on the site of the future city of Riga, which Bishop Albrecht von Buxthoeven founded in 1201.

=== Livonian Crusade and the Livonian Brothers of the Sword (1198–1229) ===
The Livonian Chronicle of Henry from the 1220s gives a firsthand account of the Christianization of Livonia, granted as a fief by the Hohenstaufen (de facto but not known as) the King of Germany, Philip of Swabia (r. 1198–1208), to Bishop Albert of Riga (Albert of Buxhoeveden), nephew of Hartwig II, the Archbishop of Bremen, who sailed (1200) with a convoy of ships filled with armed crusaders to carve out a Catholic territory in the east as part of the Livonian Crusade. Bishop Albert founded the military order of the Livonian Brothers of the Sword (Latin: Fratres militiæ Christi Livoniae, German: Schwertbrüderorden) in 1202; Pope Innocent III sanctioned the establishment in 1204. Albert did so in order to aid the Bishopric of Riga in the conversion of the pagan Curonians, Livonians, Semigallians, and Latgalians living on the shores of the Gulf of Riga. The membership of the order comprised German "warrior monks".

In 1215, Albert ordered the construction of a cathedral in Riga. In 1218, he asked King Valdemar II of Denmark for assistance, but Valdemar instead arranged a deal with the Brotherhood and conquered northern Estonia for Denmark. The Brotherhood had its headquarters at Fellin (Viljandi) in present-day Estonia, where the walls of the Master's castle still stand. Pope Gregory IX asked the Brothers to defend Finland from Novgorodian attacks in his letter of 24 November 1232; however, no known information regarding the knights' possible activities in Finland has survived. (Sweden eventually took over Finland after the Second Swedish Crusade in 1249.) In the Battle of Saule in 1236, the Lithuanians and Semigallians decimated the Order. This disaster led the surviving Brothers to become incorporated into the Order of Teutonic Knights in the following year, and from that point on they became known as the Livonian Order. They continued, however, to function in all respects (rule, clothing and policy) as an autonomous branch of the Teutonic Order, headed by their own Master (himself de jure subject to the Teutonic Order's Grand Master).

=== Internal conflicts in Livonia (1229–1236) ===
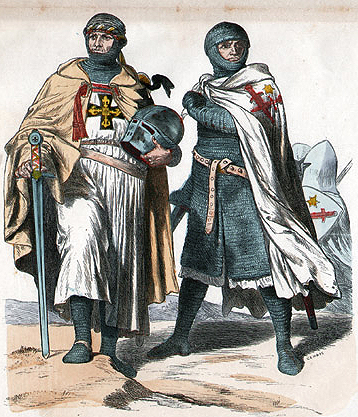
1870 drawing of a Teutonic Knight (left) and a Livonian Sword Brother.

The January 1229 death of Albert of Riga caused a diocesan feud in the Archbishopric of Riga, as two rival candidates were elected. Pope Gregory IX, through cardinal Otto of Tonengo, tasked Baldwin of Alna as papal legate to resolve the dispute. After securing the submission of Courland, Baldwin soon found himself in conflict with various factions in Livonia, fleeing to Dünamünde and temporarily leaving Livonia in early 1232. The pope made him bishop of Semigallia and gave him papal legation throughout much of Livonia, and Baldwin returned by 1233. He tried to take the castle of Reval (modern Tallinn) from the Sword Brothers, but in c. August–September 1233 they defeated Baldwin, who excommunicated many Sword Brothers in retaliation.

At that point, Livonia was divided into two camps: Baldwin's Bishopric of Semigallia, the Bishopric of Dorpat and the late Albert of Riga's Buxhöveden family plus several monasteries, most Estonians and Curonians, versus the Livonian Sword Brothers, Nicholas' Bishopric of Riga, and the city of Riga. Previous generations of historians have argued that Baldwin attempted to make the whole Baltic region an ecclesiastical state, but Manfred Hellmann (1993) refuted this idea as "fanciful speculation".

Similarly, the traditional assertion that Baldwin had extensive plans to conquer and convert eastwards into parts of Pskov and Novgorod do not stand up under scrutiny, showing that papal correspondence with Baldwin was primarily concerned with ending the internal conflict in Livonia on terms favourable to Rome. Therefore, no Livonian faction was allowed to form an alliance with an external power, be they pagan or Novgorodian, to prevent the internal conflict from spilling over and threaten Livonia's external security.

In 1234, the pope recalled Baldwin, and replaced him with William of Modena. The pope did not give a verdict until April 1236, when the Sword Brothers were tasked to return Reval to the Danish king. The terms of the agreement were not finalised until the Treaty of Stensby (7 June 1238), when the Livonian Sword Brothers, crushed at Saule and now submitted to the Teutonic Order, relinquished their claims to Reval and much of northern Estonia to Denmark, and to share future territorial gains with two-thirds for the Danish king and one third for the Livonian Order.

=== Livonian Order, the Bishoprics and Riga from 1237 until 1418 ===
Medieval Livonia ca. 1260.

The Livonian Order was a largely autonomous branch of the Teutonic Knights (or Teutonic Order) and a member of the Livonian Confederation from 1418 to 1561. After being defeated by Lithuanian forces in the 1236 Battle of Saule, the remnants of the Livonian Brothers of the Sword were incorporated into the Teutonic Knights as the Livonian Order in 1237. Between 1237 and 1290, the Livonian Order conquered all of Courland, Livonia, and Semigallia, but their attack on northern Russia was repelled in the Battle of Rakvere (1268). In 1346, after the St. George's Night Uprising the Order purchased the rest of Estonia from King Valdemar IV of Denmark. The Chronicle of Henry of Livonia and the Livonian Rhymed Chronicle describe conditions within the Order's territory. The Teutonic Order fell into decline following its defeat in the Battle of Grunwald in 1410 and the secularization of its Prussian territories by Albert of Brandenburg in 1525, but the Livonian Order managed to maintain an independent existence.

=== Livonian Confederation (1418–1561) ===
In 1418, the Archbishop of Riga, Johannes Ambundii, organised the five ecclesiastical states of the Holy Roman Empire in Medieval Livonia (Livonian Order, Courland, Ösel–Wiek, Dorpat and Riga) into the Livonian Confederation.

From the 14th to the 16th centuries, Middle Low German – as spoken in the towns of the Hanseatic League — functioned as the established language of the Livonian lands, but High German subsequently succeeded it as the official language in the course of the 16th and 17th centuries.

=== Livonian War (1558–1583) ===
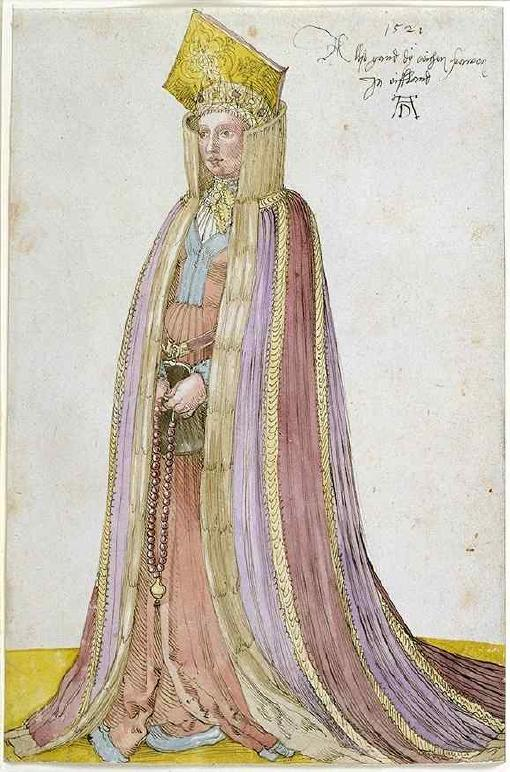
Livonian lady (1502). Albrecht Dürer.

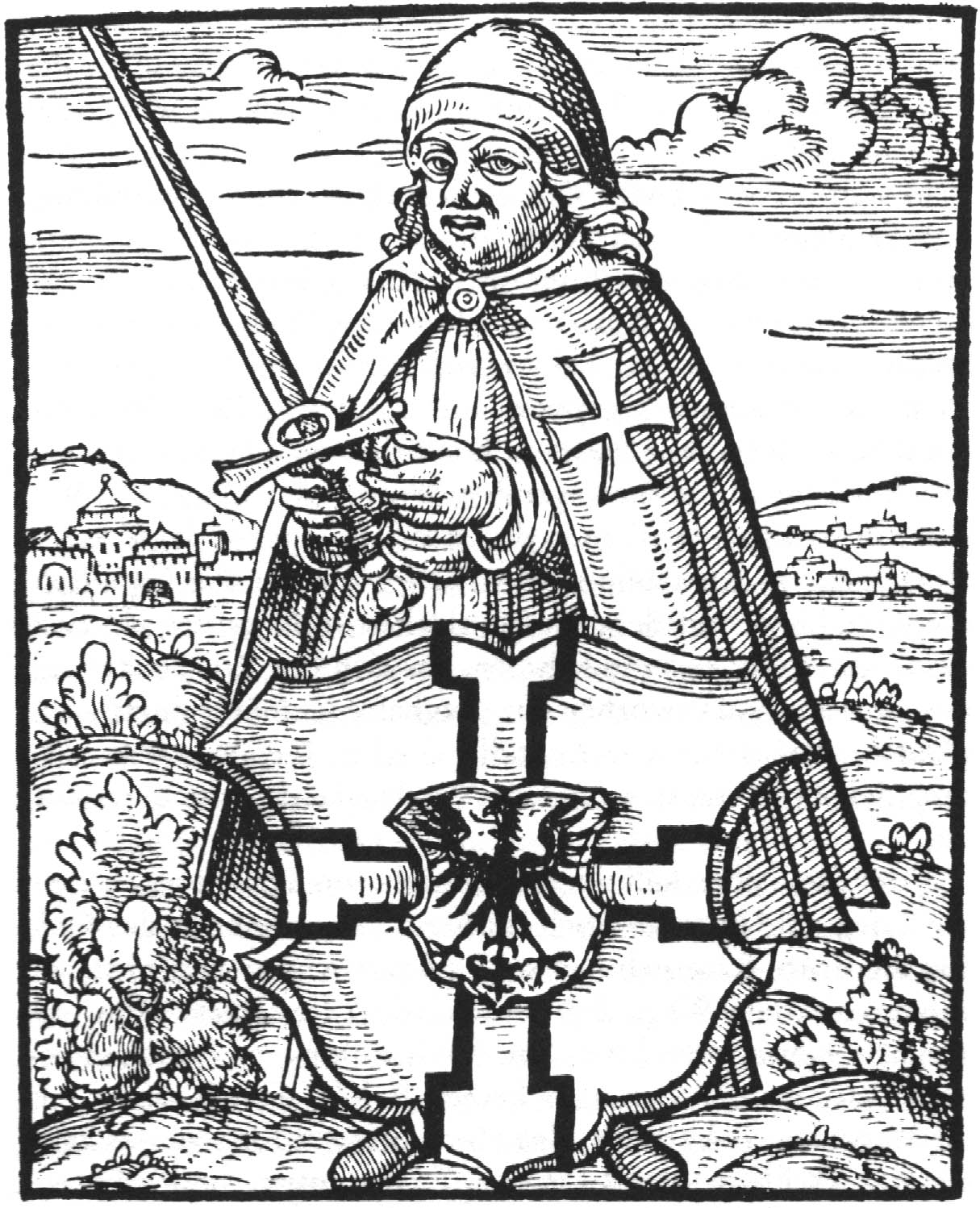
Livonian knight in the 16th century

Ferdinand I, Holy Roman Emperor once again asked for help of Gustav I of Sweden, and the Kingdom of Poland also began direct negotiations with Gustav, but nothing resulted because on 29 September 1560, Gustav I Vasa died. The chances for success of Magnus, (who had become Bishop of Courland and of Ösel-Wiek) in 1560 and his supporters looked particularly good in 1560 (and again in 1570).

In 1560, he had been recognised as their sovereign by the Bishopric of Ösel-Wiek and by the Bishopric of Courland, and as their prospective ruler by the authorities of the Bishopric of Dorpat; the Bishopric of Reval with the Harrien-Wierland gentry were on his side; the Livonian Order conditionally recognised his right of ownership of the (future) Duchy of Estonia. Then along with Archbishop Wilhelm von Brandenburg of the Archbishopric of Riga and his Coadjutor Christoph von Mecklenburg, Kettler, the last Master of the Teutonic Order, gave to Magnus the portions of the Kingdom of Livonia which he had taken possession of, but they refused to give him any more land.

Once Eric XIV of Sweden became king in September 1560 he took quick actions to get involved in the war. He negotiated a continued peace with Muscovy and spoke to the burghers of Reval city. He offered them goods to submit to him as well as threatening them. By 6 June 1561, they submitted to him contrary to the persuasions of Kettler to the burghers. King Eric's brother and future King Johan married the Polish-Lithuanian princess Catherine Jagiellon in 1562. Wanting to obtain his own land in Livonia, he loaned Poland money and then claimed the castles that they had pawned as his own instead of using them to pressure Poland. After Johan returned to Finland, Erik XIV forbade him to deal with any foreign countries without his consent. Shortly after that, Erik XIV quickly lost any allies that he was about to obtain, either in the form of Magnus or of the Archbishop of Riga. Magnus was upset that he had been tricked out of his inheritance of Holstein. After Sweden occupied Reval, Frederick II of Denmark made a treaty with Erik XIV of Sweden in August 1561. Magnus and his brother Frederick II were in great disagreement, and Frederick II negotiated a treaty with Ivan IV on 7 August 1562 to help his brother obtain more land and to stall further Swedish advances. Erik XIV opposed this and the Northern Seven Years' War (1563–1570) broke out, with Sweden pitted against the Free City of Lübeck, Denmark, and Poland-Lithuania. While only losing land and trade, Frederick II and Magnus were not faring well. But, in 1568, Erik XIV became insane and his brother Johan took his place as King John III of Sweden.

Johan III, due to his friendship with Poland-Lithuania, began a policy against Muscovy. He would try to obtain more land in Livonia and to dominate Denmark. After all parties had been financially drained, Frederick II let his ally, King Sigismund II Augustus of Polish–Lithuanian Commonwealth, know that he was ready for peace. On 15 December 1570, the Treaty of Stettin concluded the Northern Seven Years' War.

The Peace Party, however, had its own armed forces – scattered bands of household troops (Hofleute) under diverse command, which only united in action in 1565 (Battle of Pärnu and Siege of Reval), in 1570–1571 (Siege of Reval; 30 weeks), and in 1574–1576 (first on Sweden's side, then came the sale of Ösel–Wiek to the Danish Crown, and the loss of territory to Tsardom of Russia). In 1575, after Muscovy attacked Danish claims in Livonia, Frederick II dropped out of the competition, as did the Holy Roman Emperor. After this Johan III held off on his pursuit for more land due to Muscovy obtaining lands that Sweden controlled. He used the next two years of truce to get in a better position. In 1578, he resumed the fight, not only for Livonia, but also for everywhere due to an understanding that he made with the Polish–Lithuanian Commonwealth. In 1578, Magnus retired to the Commonwealth and his brother all but gave up the land in Livonia.

During the many years of the Livonian War (1558–1582), the Livonian Order suffered a decisive defeat at the hands of troops of Muscovite Russia in the Battle of Ergeme in 1560 and continued living under great threat. At stake were the Narva-trade-route and practically all trade in the North, and with that of all of Europe. Due to the religious upheavals of the Reformation the distant Holy Roman Empire could not send troops, which it could not afford anyway. The Duchy of Prussia was not able to help for much of the same reason, and Duke Albrecht (r. 1525–1568) was under continuous ban by the Empire. The Hanseatic League was greatly weakened by this and the city state of Lübeck fought its last great war. The emperor Maximilian II (r. 1564–1576) defused the greatest threat by remaining on friendly terms with Tsar Ivan IV of Russia (r. 1533–1584) but did not send Ivan IV troops as requested in the latter's struggles with the Polish–Lithuanian Commonwealth.

In 1570, Tsar Ivan IV of Russia installed Duke Magnus as King of Livonia. The other forces opposed this appointment. The Livonian Order saw no other way than to seek protection from Sigismund II Augustus (King of Poland and Grand Duke of Lithuania), who had intervened in a war between Bishop William of Riga and the Brothers in 1557. After coming to an agreement with Sigismund II Augustus and his representatives (especially Mikołaj "the Black" Radziwiłł), the last Livonian Master, Gotthard Kettler, secularized the Order and converted to Lutheranism. In the southern part of the Brothers' lands, he set up the Duchy of Courland and Semigallia for his family. Most of the remaining lands were seized by the Grand Duchy of Lithuania. Denmark and Sweden re-occupied northern Estonia.

=== Duchy of Livonia (1561–1621) ===
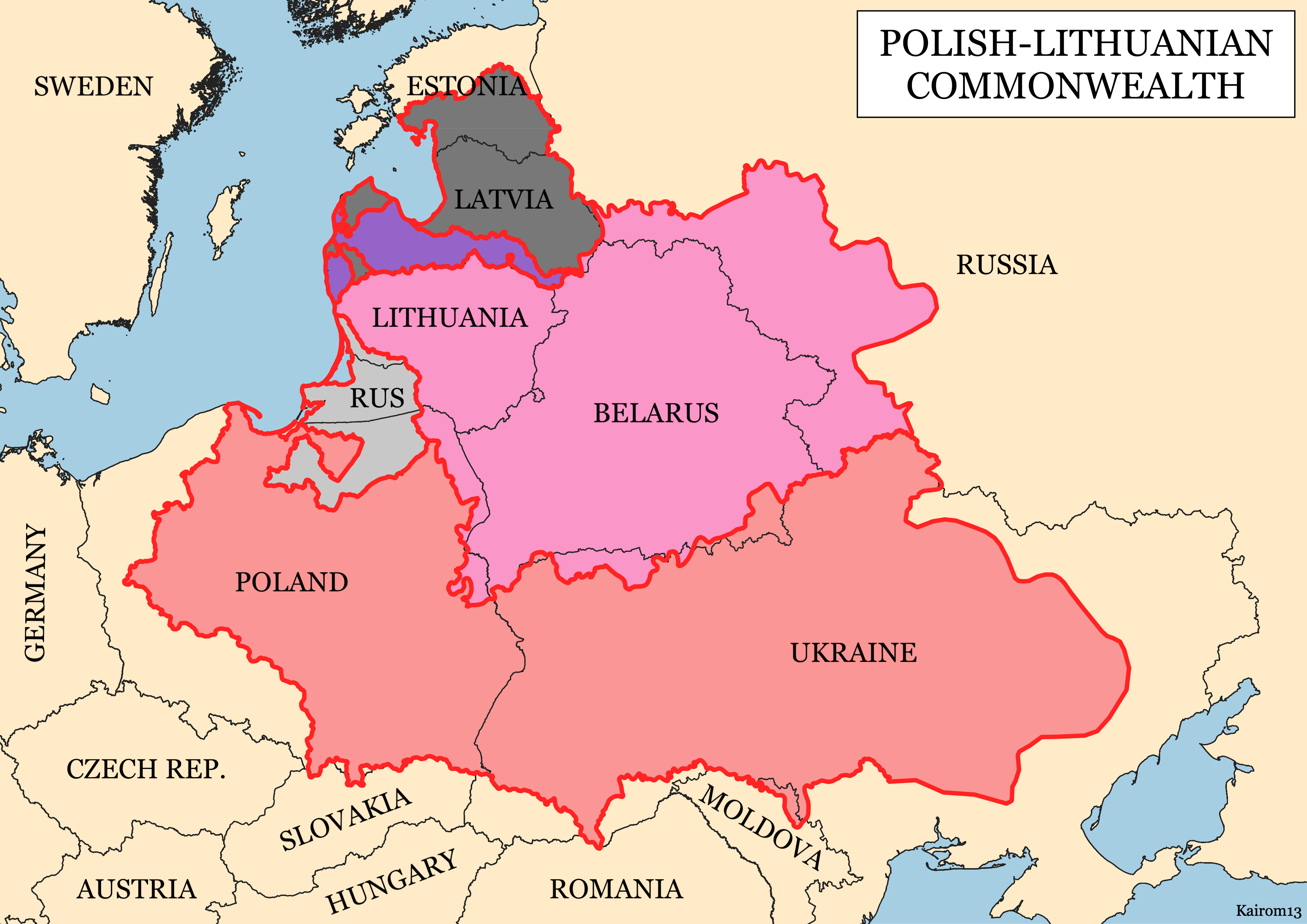
Outline of the Polish–Lithuanian Commonwealth with its major subdivisions after the 1618 Truce of Deulino, superimposed on present-day national borders. Crown of the Kingdom of Poland Grand Duchy of Lithuania Duchy of Livonia Duchy of Prussia, Polish fief Duchy of Courland and Semigallia, Commonwealth fief

In 1561, during the Livonian War, Livonia fell to the Grand Duchy of Lithuania and became a dependent vassal of Lithuania.

In 1569, when the Grand Duchy of Lithuania and the Kingdom of Poland formed the Polish–Lithuanian Commonwealth, Livonia became a joint domain administered directly by the king and grand duke. Having rejected peace proposals from its enemies, Ivan the Terrible found himself in a difficult position by 1579, when Crimean Khanate devastated Muscovian territories and burnt down Moscow (see Russo-Crimean Wars), the drought and epidemics have fatally affected the economy, Oprichnina had thoroughly disrupted the government, while The Grand Principality of Lithuania had united with The Kingdom of Poland (1385–1569) and acquired an energetic leader, Stefan Batory, supported by Ottoman Empire (1576). Stefan Batory replied with a series of three offensives against Muscovy, trying to cut The Kingdom of Livonia from Muscovian territories. During his first offensive in 1579, with 22,000 men, he retook Polotsk; during the second, in 1580, with 29,000-strong army, he took Velikie Luki, and in 1581 with a 100,000-strong army he started the Siege of Pskov. Frederick II of Denmark and Norway had trouble continuing the fight against Muscovy unlike Sweden and Poland. He came to an agreement with John III in 1580, giving him the titles in Livonia. That war would last from 1577 to 1582. Muscovy recognized Polish–Lithuanian control of Ducatus Ultradunensis only in 1582. After Magnus von Lyffland died in 1583, Poland invaded his territories in The Duchy of Courland, and Frederick II decided to sell his rights of inheritance. Except for the island of Œsel, Denmark was out of the Baltic by 1585. As of 1598 Inflanty Voivodeship was divided onto:

- Wenden Voivodeship (województwo wendeńskie, Kieś)
- Dorpat Voivodeship (województwo dorpackie, Dorpat)
- Parnawa Voivodeship (województwo parnawskie, Parnawa)

Based on a guarantee by Sigismund II Augustus from the 1560s, the German language retained its official status.

=== Kingdom of Livonia (1570–1578) ===
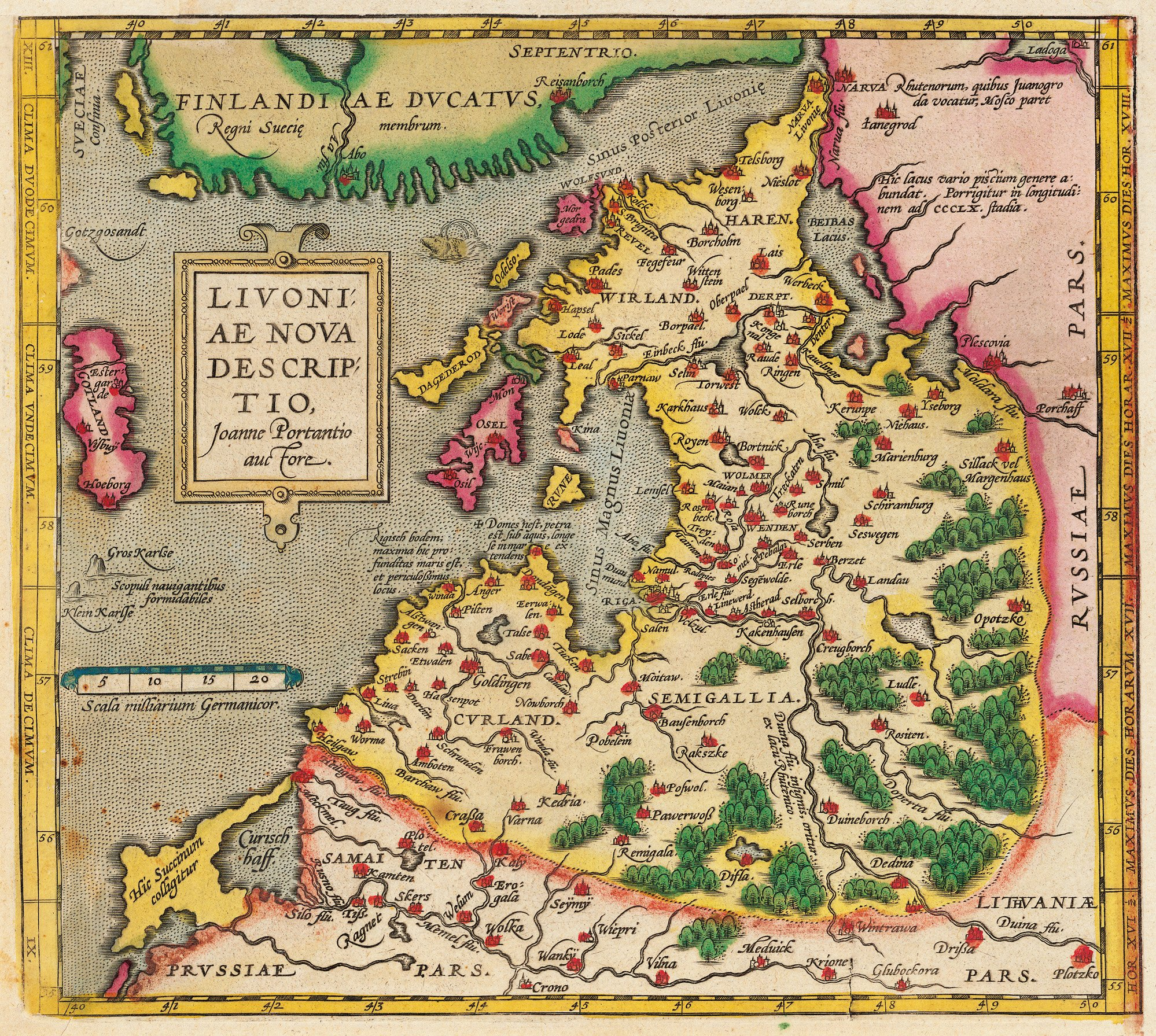
Livonia, as shown in the map of 1573 of Theatrum orbis terrarum.

The armies of Ivan the Terrible were initially successful, taking Polotsk (1563) and Parnawa (1575) and overrunning much of Grand Duchy of Lithuania up to some 250 km (160 mi) proximity of Vilnius. Eventually, the Grand Duchy of Lithuania and Kingdom of Poland formed the Polish–Lithuanian Commonwealth in 1569 under the Union of Lublin. Eric XIV of Sweden did not like this, and the Northern Seven Years' War between the Free City of Lübeck, Denmark, Poland, and Sweden broke out. Losing land and trade, Frederick II of Denmark and Magnus von Lyffland of the Œsel-Wiek did not fare well. But, in 1569, Erik XIV became insane and his brother, John III of Sweden, took his place. After all parties had been financially drained, Frederick II let his ally, King Zygmunt II August, know that he was ready for peace. On 15 December 1570, the Treaty of Stettin was concluded.

In the next phase of the conflict, in 1577, Ivan IV took advantage of the Commonwealth's internal strife following the Danzig rebellion during the reign of Stefan Batory and invaded Livonia, quickly taking almost the entire territory, with the exception of Riga and Reval. In 1578, Magnus of Livonia recognized the sovereignty of the Polish–Lithuanian Commonwealth (not ratified by the Sejm of Poland-Lithuania, nor recognized by Denmark). The Kingdom of Livonia was beaten back by Muscovy on all fronts. In 1578, Magnus of Livonia retired to the Bishopric of Courland, and his brother all but gave up the land in Livonia.

=== Swedish Livonia (1629–1721) ===
Sweden was given roughly the same area as the former Duchy of Livonia after the 1621–1625 Polish–Swedish War. The area, usually known as Swedish Livonia, became a very important Swedish dominion, with Riga being the second largest Swedish city and Livonia paying for one third of the Swedish war costs. Sweden lost Swedish Livonia, Duchy of Estonia and Swedish Ingria to the Russian Empire almost 100 years later, by the Capitulation of Estonia and Livonia in 1710 and the Treaty of Nystad in 1721.

=== Livonian Voivodeship (1620s–1772) ===
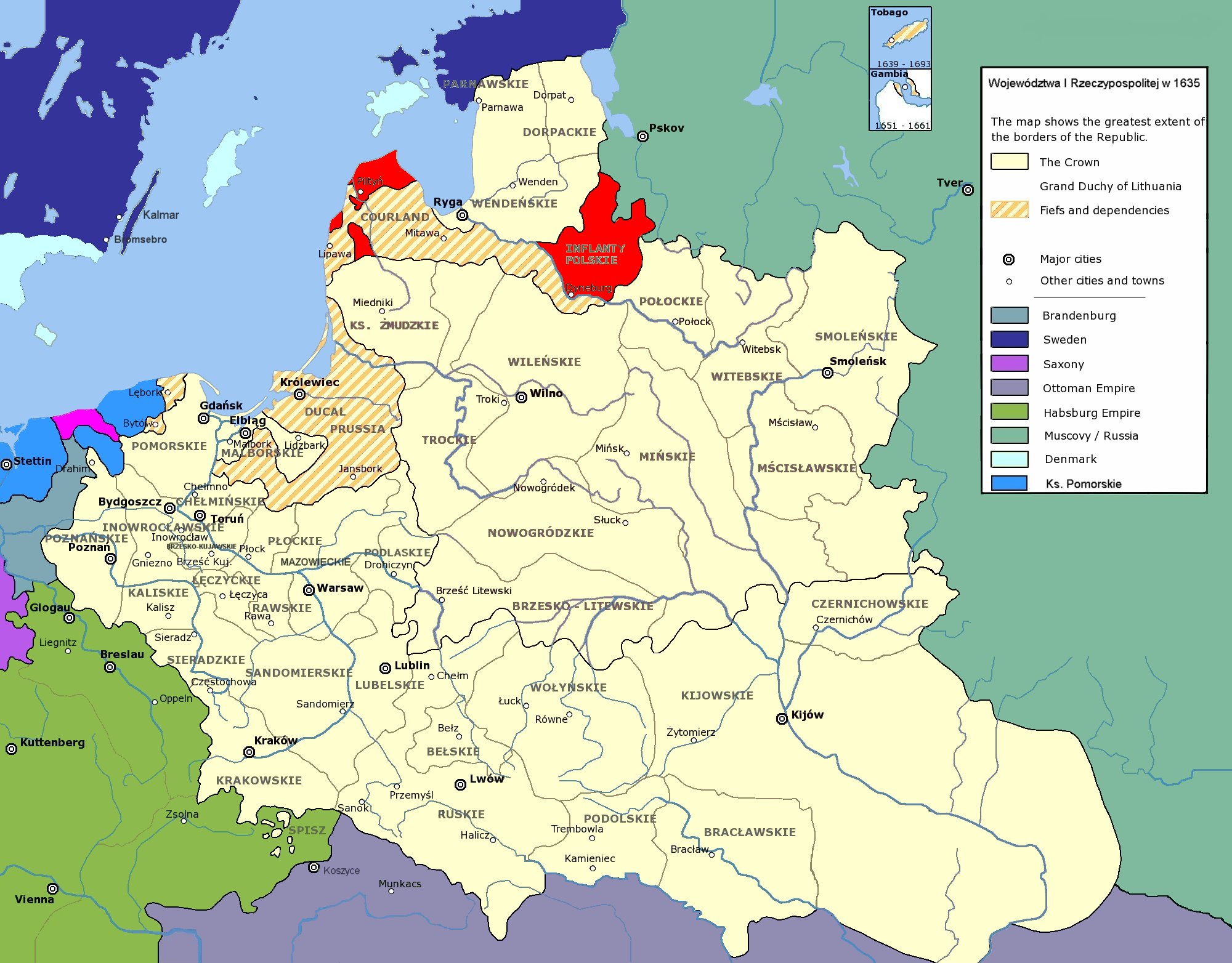
Inflanty Voivodeship, 1620s–1772.

The Livonian Voivodeship (Lithuanian: Livonijos vaivadija; Polish: Województwo inflanckie) was a unit of administrative division and local government in the Duchy of Livonia, part of the Polish–Lithuanian Commonwealth, since it was formed in the 1620s out of the Wenden Voivodeship until the First Partition of Poland in 1772.

=== Riga Governorate (1721–1796) ===
The Russian Empire conquered Swedish Livonia during the course of the Great Northern War and acquired the province in the Capitulation of Estonia and Livonia in 1710, confirmed by the Treaty of Nystad in 1721. Peter the Great confirmed German as the exclusive official language. Russia then added Polish Livonia in 1772 during the Partitions of Poland.

=== Governorate of Livonia (1796–1918) ===
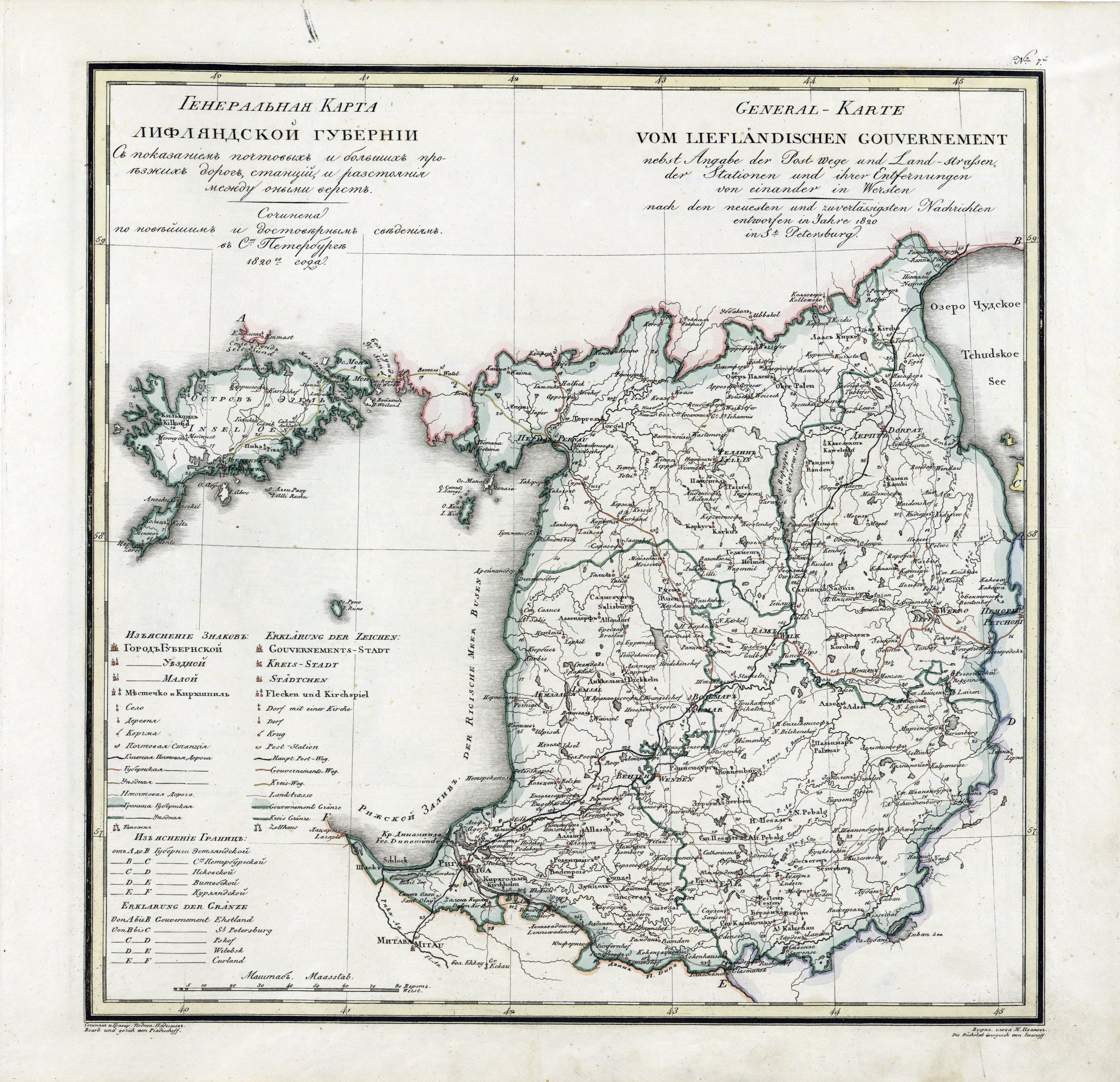
Governorate of Livonia, 1820

In 1796, the Riga Governorate was renamed as the Governorate of Livonia (Russian: Лифляндская губе́рния / Liflyandskaya guberniya, Latvian: Vidzemes guberņa, Estonian: Liivimaa kubermang). From 1845 to 1876, the Baltic governorates of Estonia, Livonia, and Courland — an area roughly corresponding to the historical medieval Livonia — were administratively subordinated to a common Governor-General. Among the holders of this post were Count Alexander Arkadyevich Suvorov and Count Pyotr Andreyevich Shuvalov.

Livonia remained within the Russian Empire until the end of World War I, when it was split between the newly independent states of Latvia and Estonia. The United Baltic Duchy, alternately known as the "Grand Duchy of Livonia", proclaimed by the Baltic German nobility on 12 April 1918, was never recognised by any state, and dissolved at the German surrender in November 1918. Livonia had ceased to exist. From 1918 to 1920, both Soviet troops and German Freikorps fought against Latvian and Estonian troops for control over former Livonia, but their attempts were defeated.

== Legacy ==
The historical land of Livonia has been split between Latvia and Estonia ever since 1918. The Livonian language is spoken by fewer than 100 individuals as a second language, and is understood to be fast approaching extinction. The last native Livonian speaker died in June 2013.

The unofficial anthem of the Livonians, "Min izāmō", shares the melody of the Finnish and Estonian national anthems.

== See also ==
- Bishopric of Reval
- Courland
- Livonian Coast
- Duchy of Courland
- History of Estonia
- History of Latvia
- History of Lithuania
- History of Poland

== Gallery ==
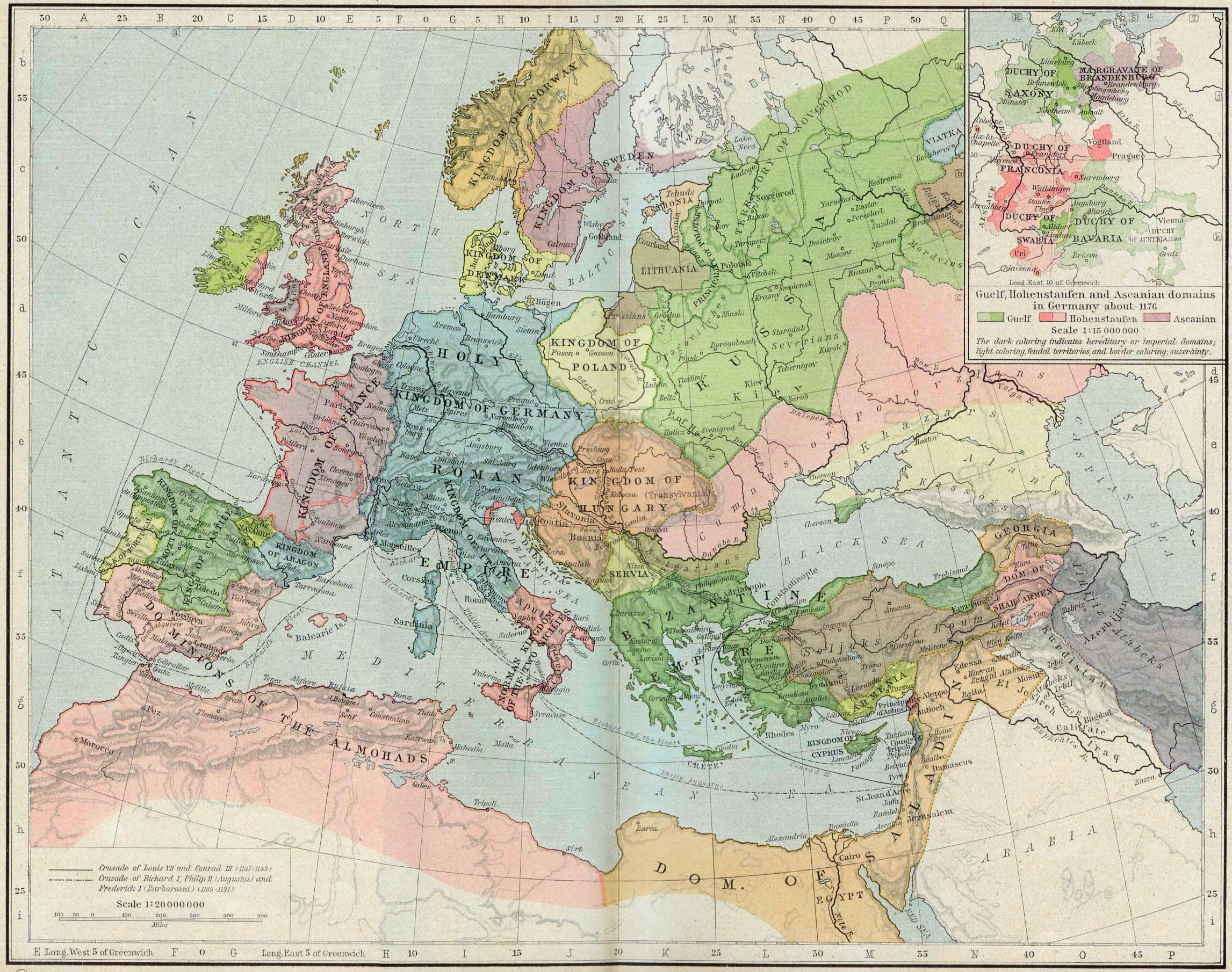
Livonia in Europe, 1190.

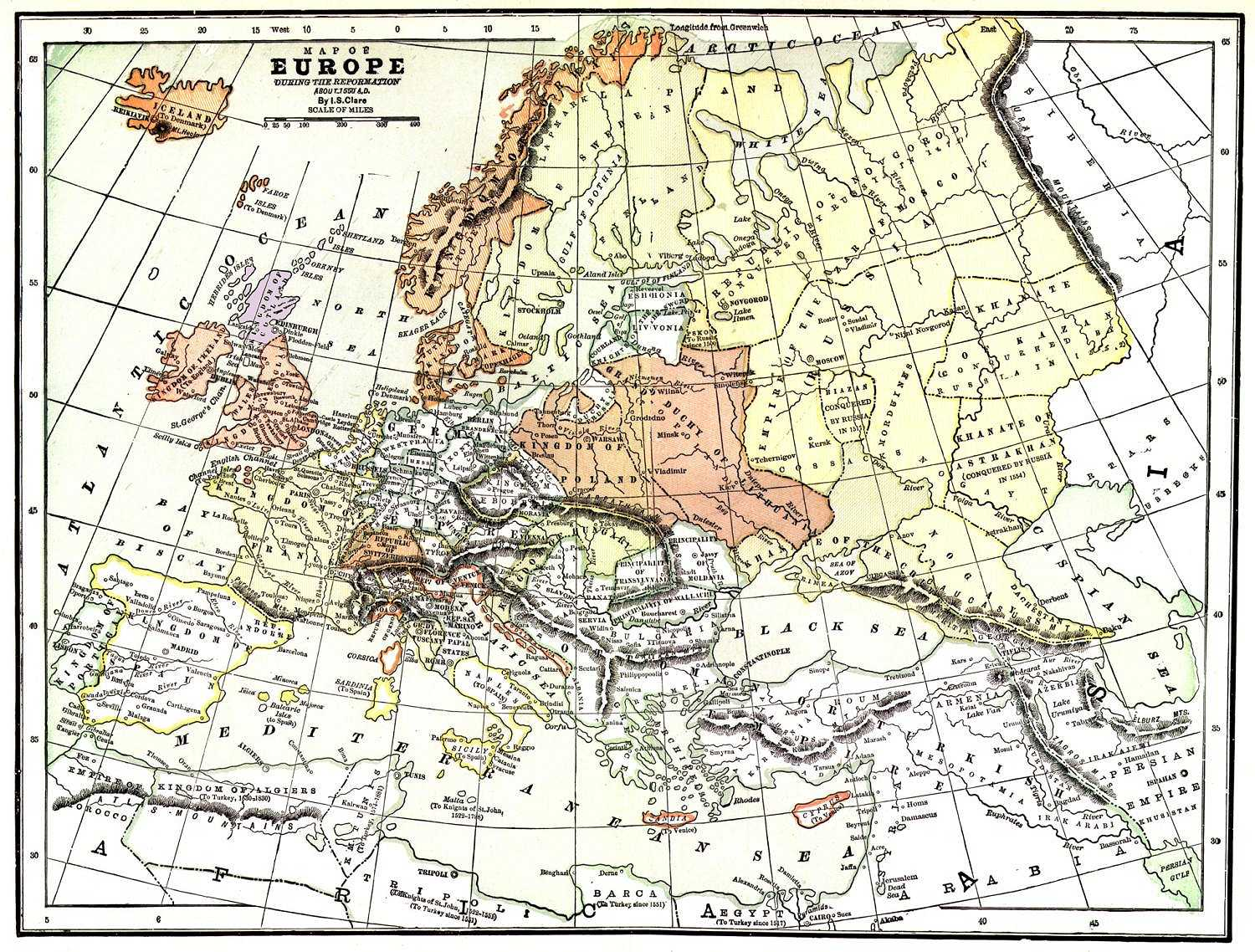
Europe, 1550.

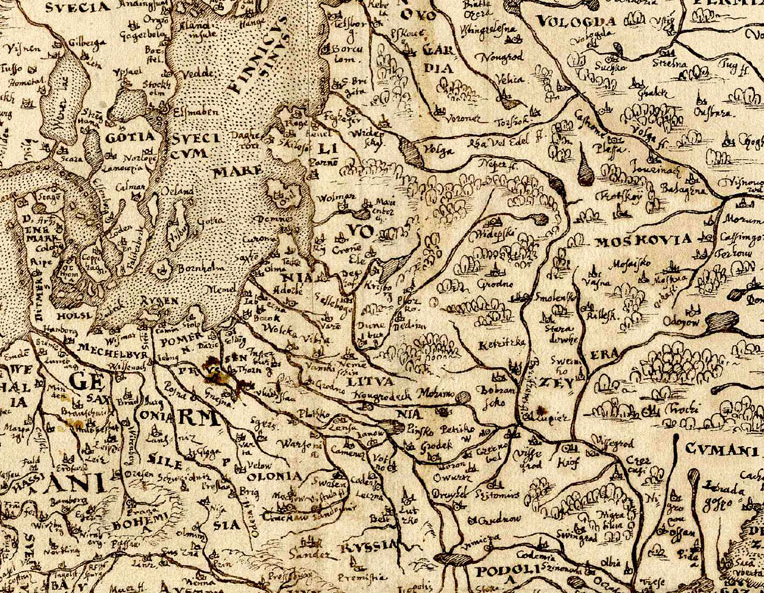
Livonia on a 1570 map

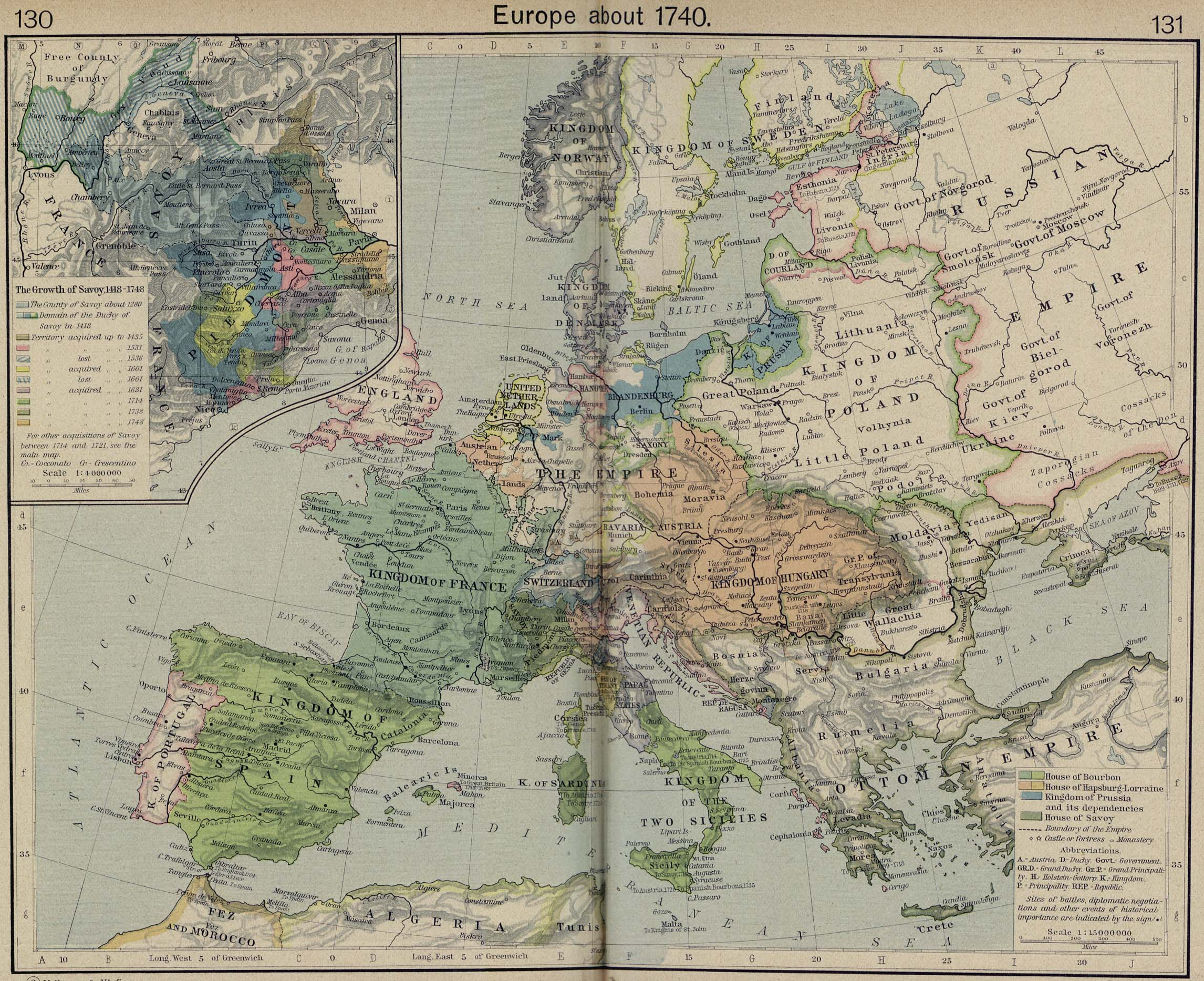
Europe, 1740.

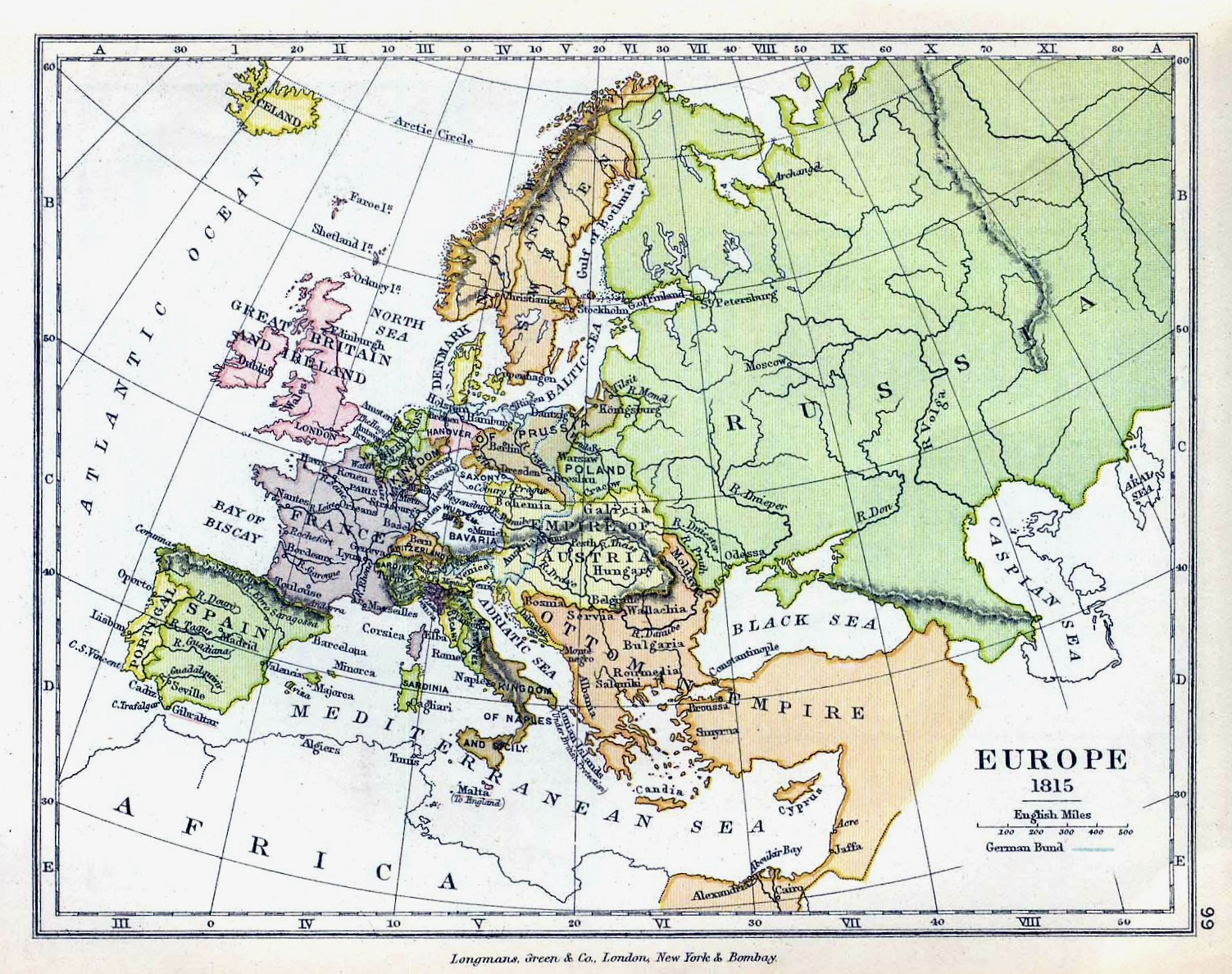
Europe, 1815.

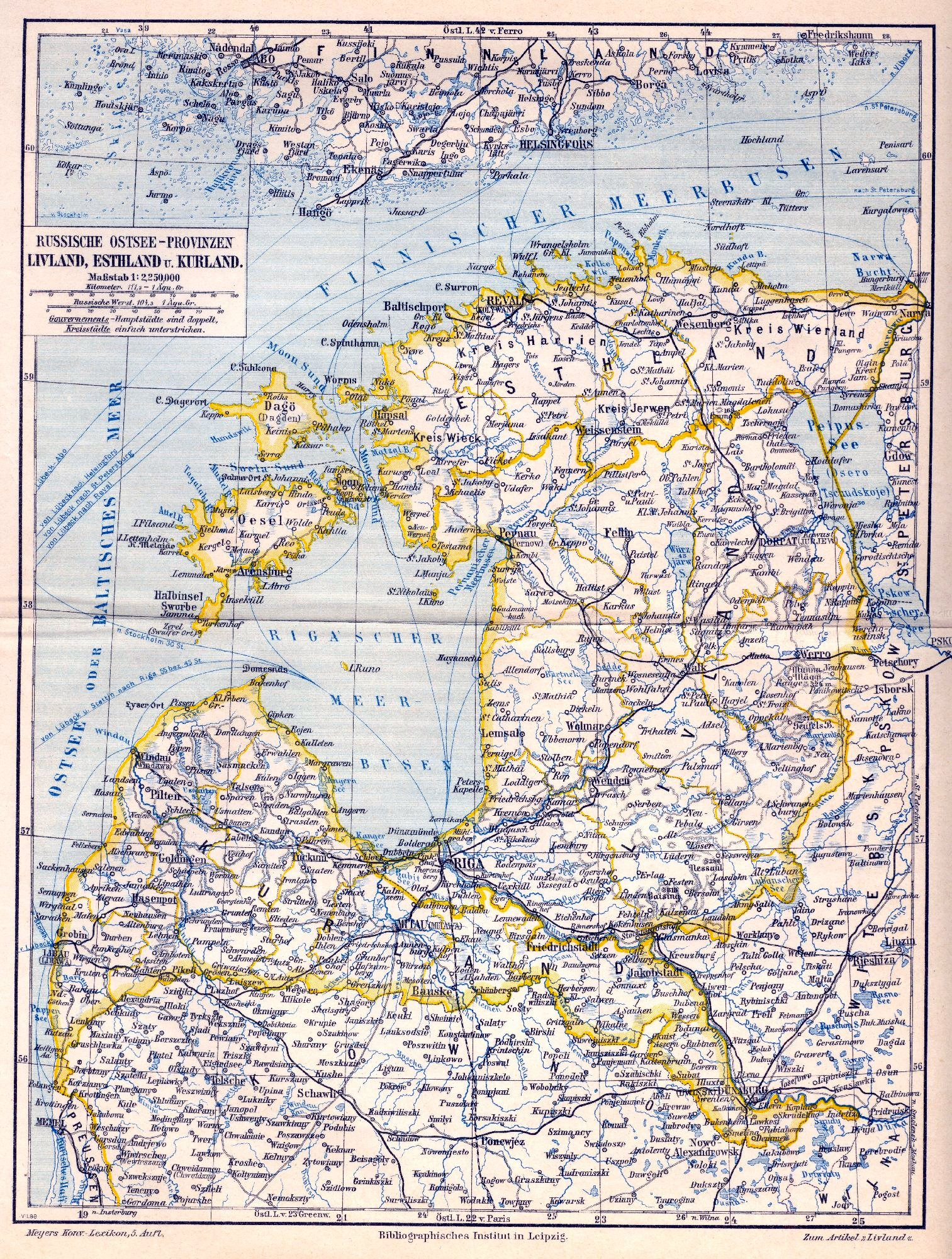
Livonia, 1898.

== Bibliography ==
- Selart, Anti (2015). "Chapter 3: Livonia and Rus' in the 1230s and 1240s". Livonia, Rus' and the Baltic Crusades in the Thirteenth Century. Leiden/Boston: BRILL. pp. 127–170. doi:10.1163/9789004284753_005. ISBN 978-90-04-28475-3.
  - Conedera, Sam (2012). "Review: Livonia, Rus' and the Baltic Crusades in the Thirteenth Century (East Central and Eastern Europe in the Middle Ages, 450–1450, 29) by Anti Selart". Archivum Historiae Pontificiae. 50. Gregorian Biblical Press: 221–224. ISSN 0066-6785. JSTOR 44627101.
