= Jerome Horsey =

English politician and explorer (c. 1550 – 1626)

Drawing from Stories of Russian Folk-Life by Donald Alexander MacKenzie.

Sir Jerome Horsey (c. 1550 – 1626), of Great Kimble, Buckinghamshire, was an English explorer, diplomat and politician in the 16th and 17th centuries.

He spent much time in Russia over the course of seventeen years, first arriving in 1573 and leaving in 1591. He got to know well many leading people at the Russian court. He first travelled to Moscow as an agent for the Russia Company, and later acted as an envoy of Tsar Ivan the Terrible to Queen Elizabeth and then from the English court under Queen Elizabeth to Ivan. After returning to England, Horsey served in the House of Commons, sitting on many committees including the Committee for Returns, Elections, and Privileges. Knighted in 1603, he wrote accounts of his time in Russia which have been published several times, and was the subject of two novels.

== Family background ==
Horsey was the son of William Horsey, a merchant at Exeter, by Elinor Peryam. He was the grandson of Sir John Horsey II of Sherborne, Dorset and nephew of Sir Edward Horsey who was Captain of the Isle of Wight in the period leading up to the Spanish Armada. Horsey probably married three times:

1. Elizabeth Hampden whom he married in January 1592, by whom he had 2 sons and 3 daughters. She died in 1607.
2. Isabella Brocket whom he married about October 1609.
3. Elizabeth North (uncertain - not mentioned in will)

== At the court of Ivan IV ==
Horsey was apprenticed to the Russia Company in 1571, but the latter was prevented from trading in Russia for a period and his first experience was of trading with the Dutch. Initially, he went to Russia in May 1573 on the resumption of trade and was an interpreter. On his way to Moscow, he was given gold and jewels by the gentry and clergy of Kostroma for saving the town from the Tsar.

On arriving in Moscow he supposedly rescued Madelyn van Uxell from being sent to a brothel by the Tsar, an act which served him well later. The Russia Company asked Horsey to negotiate a new charter and to use his influence to get extra land for the English compound (which still stands on Varvarka Street in Zaryadye). Part of this land was set aside for his own house, where he entertained Russian noblemen and had personal servants.

He later boasted of saving a number of German prisoners taken when the colony was supposedly massacred. The merchants of Hamburg later gave him a damask tablecloth and napkins while those of Lübeck gave him a "great silver loving cup". He also befriended the 1200 Scots (and a few English) prisoners that were in Moscow. He arranged for them to get paid employment in the Russian Army and got permission for them to build a church.

During his time in Moscow, Horsey seems to have carried out private trading on behalf of members of the English Court, such as Leicester and Walsingham, which was against the rules of the Russia Company. This later caused a dispute with the company, but eventually the problem was resolved by his giving up the property he owned in Moscow, and it was found that they owed him money rather than the other way around.

== At the court of Ivan's successors ==
Ivan IV of Russia Showing His Treasury to Jerome Horsey (from a 1875 Russian painting by Alexander Litovchenko)

Horsey seems to have spent considerable time at the Russian Court, being invited by Tsar Ivan into the Treasury and attending the coronation of his successor Tsar Feodor I. The Russian Court was very divided. Jerome says that "my most implacable enemy" was Vasily Shchelkanov but Boris Godunov was a friend.

Another friend, whom he seems later to have wanted to marry, was Princess Maria Vladimirovna. Maria first became the wife of Magnus the Dane but after Magnus's death Horsey was asked by Boris to persuade her to return to Russia where she was imprisoned. However, the marriage with Maria was not allowed as he was a commoner, and she was placed in a nunnery.

In late November 1581 Horsey was asked by Ivan to take letters, hidden in a flask, to Queen Elizabeth. He had to travel overland as the sea was frozen. This journey was very difficult and included being arrested at the Danish island of Oesel, but the wife of the governor happened to be Madelyn van Uxel whom he had saved earlier. Horsey also had to pass through Pilten where he met Maria the Russian princess.

== Second visit to Russia ==
On arrival in London, Horsey had several meetings with Queen Elizabeth, translating the papers he had carried into English. Horsey returned to Russia with nine ships loaded with cargo, partly supplied by adventurers outside the Russia Company.

He later returned to England with letters from the Tsar asking for help, as the wife of the Tsar was having difficulty conceiving. However, this was misunderstood, and Jerome returned with a midwife, which did not go down well at the Russian court. The English at this time also lost favour as it was thought that the Spaniards would conquer England. When the Russians learned that the Spanish Armada was scattered, the English had half their customs duty removed.

Horsey again returned to England in 1587, having apparently agreed with Boris Godunov that he would marry Maria on his return. He was then accused of fraud. However, his friends at the English court stood by him. He was asked to return to Russia in 1591, but the Tsar would not see him and asked Elizabeth never to permit him to come to Russia again. He was accused of being "a well known spy". Boris Godunov arranged for his journey back to England and gave him a large present of money.

== Return to England ==
In 1595 Horsey was accused of high treason by Finch, whom he had caused to be sent home from Moscow. It is thought that Finch was put up to this by Sir Jeremy Bowes, the ex-ambassador to Moscow, who thought that Horsey had caused him to be sent home by the Russians. Among other things, Horsey was stated to have said "Our Virgin Quene is no more a virgin than I am". The queen had no choice but to sign a warrant for his arrest, but she said "I still believe Jerome Horsey will prove himself honest". The case came before the Privy Council in April 1597 but was dismissed, and Finch was proved to be a liar by witnesses.

Horsey worked for the Russia Company from 1572 to about 1585. He was made an Esquire of the Body to Queen Elizabeth in 1580, was knighted on 23 July 1603 and Receiver of Crown Lands in nine counties in June 1604. He was a Justice of the Peace in Buckinghamshire from about 1601 and High Sheriff of Buckinghamshire in 1611–1612. He represented various places, Saltash (1593), Camelford (1597), Bossiney (1601, 1604, and 1614) and East Looe (1621), in Parliament, serving over 30 years. He translated the Slavonic Bible and was responsible for introducing the term "White Russia" into England for Belarus.

He died in January 1626 and was buried at Great Kimble. Horsey is occasionally cited as a contemporary authority on Eastern Europe, Russia, and the reign of Ivan the Terrible.

Political offices
| Preceded by Sir Robert Lovet | High Sheriff of Buckinghamshire; 1611–1612 | Succeeded by Sir Edward Tyrell |
