= 1350 =

1350 in various calendars
- Gregorian calendar: 1350; MCCCL
- Ab urbe condita: 2103
- Armenian calendar: 799; ԹՎ ՉՂԹ
- Assyrian calendar: 6100
- Balinese saka calendar: 1271–1272
- Bengali calendar: 756–757
- Berber calendar: 2300
- English Regnal year: 23 Edw. 3 – 24 Edw. 3
- Buddhist calendar: 1894
- Burmese calendar: 712
- Byzantine calendar: 6858–6859
- Chinese calendar: 己丑年 (Earth Ox); 4047 or 3840 — to — 庚寅年 (Metal Tiger); 4048 or 3841
- Coptic calendar: 1066–1067
- Discordian calendar: 2516
- Ethiopian calendar: 1342–1343
- Hebrew calendar: 5110–5111
- Hindu calendars
- Vikram Samvat: 1406–1407
- Shaka Samvat: 1271–1272
- Kali Yuga: 4450–4451
- Holocene calendar: 11350
- Igbo calendar: 350–351
- Iranian calendar: 728–729
- Islamic calendar: 750–751
- Japanese calendar: Jōwa 6 / Kannō 1 (観応元年)
- Javanese calendar: 1262–1263
- Julian calendar: 1350; MCCCL
- Korean calendar: 3683
- Minguo calendar: 562 before ROC 民前562年
- Nanakshahi calendar: −118
- Thai solar calendar: 1892–1893
- Tibetan calendar: ས་མོ་གླང་ལོ་ (female Earth-Ox); 1476 or 1095 or 323 — to — ལྕགས་ཕོ་སྟག་ལོ་ (male Iron-Tiger); 1477 or 1096 or 324

Year 1350 (MCCCL) was a common year starting on Friday of the Julian calendar.

== Events ==
=== January–December ===
- January 9 – Giovanni II Valente becomes Doge of Genoa.
- February 3 – Emperor Sukō of Northern Japan is enthroned as Emperor in a ceremony in Kyoto, 21 months after he began is reign on November 13, 1348. Suko continues to claim the right to rule in Tokyo in Southern Japan, where the Emperor Go-Murakami is in power.
- February 9 – Less than five months after the death of his first wife, the Dauphin Jean de Bourbon marries Joan I, Countess of Auvergne, at the in the royal Château de Sainte-Gemme at Feucherolles, near Saint-Germain-en-Laye.
- February 23 – The "Murder Night of Zurich" (Mordracht von Zürich) begins in the Swiss city of Zurich as the city's mayor, Rudolf Brun, stops an attempted coup by the Habsburg Count Johann II of Rapperswil and kills other suspected rebels. According to one source, 15 of the conspirators are killed in the battle, while another 35 are captured and executed. Brun orders 18 of the prisoners to be }broken on the wheel", and the beheading of 17 others.
- May 23 (possible date) – Hook and Cod wars in the County of Holland: A number of nobles and progressive cities supporting William V, Count of Holland, in his power struggle with his mother Margaret I, Countess of Holland, found the Cod League and perhaps sign the Cod Alliance Treaty.
- August 22 – Upon the death of King Philippe VI of France, his eldest son, the Dauphin, becomes King Jean II, referred to in English translations as King John the Second.
- August 29 – Battle of Winchelsea (Les Espagnols sur Mer) off the south coast of England: An English fleet personally commanded by King Edward III defeats a Castilian fleet.
- September 5 – Hook and Cod wars in the County of Holland: Conservative noblemen found the Hook League and sign the Hook Alliance Treaty.
- November 17 – To pay for the expenses of the revived war with the Republic of Venice, the Republic of Genoa has to subscribe a loan at an interest rate of 10%, from an association of creditors known as the Compera imposita per gerra Venetorum.

=== Date unknown ===
- Hayam Wuruk becomes ruler of the Majapahit Empire.
- The Punta Lobos massacre is carried out by members of the powerful Chimu Empire in Peru, leaving a residue of 200 murders.
- The Black Death first appears in Scotland and Sweden.
- The castle of Rapperswil is largely destroyed by Rudolf Brun, mayor of the city of Zürich.
- Approximate date – Latest likely date for first permanent settlement of New Zealand by Māori people.

== Births ==
- January 23 – Vincent Ferrer, Valencian missionary and saint (d. 1419)
- April 13 – Margaret III, Countess of Flanders (d. 1405)
- June 27 – Manuel II Palaiologos, Byzantine Emperor (d. 1425)
- October 12 – Dmitri Donskoi, Grand Duke of Muscovy and Vladimir (d. 1389)
- November 25 – Katherine Swynford, mistress of John of Gaunt (approximate date; d. 1403)
- December 27 – John I of Aragon (d. 1396)
- date unknown
  - Jehuda Cresques, Catalan cartographer (d. 1427)
  - Agnolo Gaddi, Italian painter (d. 1396)
  - William Gascoigne, Chief Justice of England (approximate date; d. 1419)
  - Thomas Holland, 2nd Earl of Kent (d. 1397)
  - John Montacute, 3rd Earl of Salisbury (approximate date; d. 1400)
  - Madhava of Sangamagrama, Indian mathematician (d. 1425)
  - John I Stanley of the Isle of Man (approximate date; d. 1414)
  - Hrvoje Vukčić Hrvatinić (d. 1415)
  - William le Scrope, 1st Earl of Wiltshire (d. 1399)
  - Andrew of Wyntoun, Scottish historian (d. 1420)
  - Záviš von Zap, Czech theologian and composer (d. c. 1411)

== Deaths ==
- January 6 – Giovanni I di Murta, second doge of the Republic of Genoa
- March 26 or 27 March – Alfonso XI of Castile (b. 1311)
- August 22 – Philip VI of France (b. 1293)
- November 19 – Raoul II of Brienne, Count of Eu
- December 26 – Jean de Marigny, French bishop
- date unknown
  - Maol Íosa V, Earl of Strathearn, last Gaelic Mormaer of Strathearn
  - Olaf of Roskilde, last Danish Bishop of Reval
  - Gayatri Rajapatni, Queen consort of Majapahit
- probable
  - Juan Ruiz, Archpriest of Hita (b. c. 1283)
  - Margaret, Countess of Soissons
  - Namdev, Marathi saint and poet (b. 1270)
- supposed – Till Eulenspiegel, German prankster
