= Maria Vladimirovna of Staritsa =

- Queen of Livonia
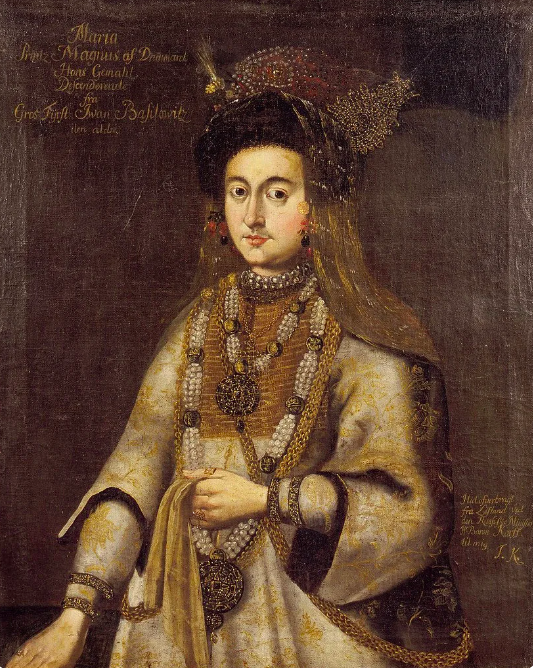
- Portrait of Maria of Staritsa (1568)
- Born: c. 1560; Staritsa
- Died: 13 May 1610 (aged 49–50)
- Burial: Trinity Lavra of St. Sergius
- Spouse: Magnus, Duke of Holstein
- Issue: Maria of Holstein; Eudoxia of Holstein
- House: Daniilovichi (by birth); Oldenburg (by marriage)
- Father: Vladimir Andreyevich of Staritsa
- Mother: Eudoxia Romanovna Odoyvskaya
- Religion: Eastern Orthodoxy

Maria Vladimirovna of Staritsa (c. 1560 in Staritsa – 13 May 1610) was a Russian princess.

== Early life and ancestry ==
Born into the Daniilovichi branch of the House of Rurik, she was the daughter of Prince Vladimir of Staritsa by his second wife, Princess Eudoxia Romanovna Odoyevskaya (d. 1569), and, through her father, descended from Sophia Palaiologina.

== Marriage and issue ==
On 12 April 1574, in Novgorod, she married Magnus of Livonia, member of the House of Oldenburg, second son of Christian III of Denmark and his wife, Dorothea of Saxe-Lauenburg. They had:

1. Maria of Holstein (July 1580 – 1597).
2. Eudoxia of Holstein (January 1581 – 18 March 1589).

== Biography ==
Upon her husband's death, Jerome Horsey escorted Maria from the Bishopric of Courland to the court of Boris Godunov. Although Horsey proposed to marry her, Godunov was anxious to get rid of a potential claimant to the throne. As a result, Maria was forced to take the veil and entered a convent adjacent to the Troitse-Sergiyeva Lavra.

In 1609, she entered into correspondence with her false cousin, False Dmitry II, who had proclaimed himself Tsar. Her subsequent fate is not documented.

== Death and burial ==
There are various resources about her death. In some documents she died on 13 May 1610, but in other resources, she died after 1611.
