= Thrugot =

Thrugot or Trued (died 1279) was Bishop of Reval (modern-day Tallinn) from 1260 to 1279.

Thrugot was a canon at Roskilde Cathedral before being appointed Bishop of Reval in 1260 following the death of his predecessor, Thorkill. Like the bishops before and after him, his appointment was formally uncanonical, as he was appointed by the Danish Queen and regent Margaret Sambiria rather than by the Pope. His appointment was later confirmed by the pope in 1263, and the following year Thrugot travelled to Orvieto to receive the insignia of his office from Pope Urban IV. The Pope also convinced the Danish Crown to grant the bishopric sufficient land to support its own cathedral chapter, allowing the chapter thereafter to elect its own bishops.

Thrugot's episcopate was marked by political and military instability, including armed skirmishes with Russian forces and conflicts with the bishopric's vassals over financial obligations and the payment of tithes.

== Sources cited ==
- Bricka, Carl Frederik, ed. (1903). Dansk Biografisk Lexikon. XVII. BIND Svend Tveskjæg - Tøxen (in Danish). Vol. 17. Copenhagen: Gyldendalske Boghandels Forlag. pp. 353–354. OCLC 632818019.
- Rebane, P. Peter (1974). "The Danish Bishops of Tallinn, 1260–1346". Journal of Baltic Studies. 5 (4). Taylor & Francis: 315–328.
