= Crusader states (disambiguation) =

Crusader states were four realms—the Principality of Antioch, County of Edessa, Kingdom of Jerusalem and County of Tripoli—formed in the Levant as a result of the First Crusade between 1098 and 1109.

Crusader states may also include:

- Kingdom of Cyprus, a state on the island of Cyprus from 1196 to 1489
- Frankokratia, or Frankish Greece, the realms established on the ruins of the Byzantine Empire after the Fourth Crusade in the early 13th century
- State of the Teutonic Order, a monastic state established by the Teutonic Knights in the Baltic region
- Terra Mariana, a state established in Livonia in the aftermath of the Livonian Crusade on 2 February 1207
