= Walk, Livonia =

Historical German name for the town Valga/Valka (Estonia/Latvia)

Coordinates: 57°46′18″N 26°01′11″E

Walk was the historical German name for the town that is since 1920 divided into Valga in Estonia and Valka in Latvia. After 1419 it was the seat of the Landtag of the Livonian Confederation.

== Demographics ==
Ethnic composition 1897
Ethnicity	1897	
Ethnicity	amount	%
Latvians	4453	40.8
Estonians	3594	32.9
Russians (Note: Including Ukrainians and Belarusians)	1214	11.1
Germans	1145	10.5
Jews	303	2.77
Poles	197	1.80
other	16	0.15
Total	10922	100

Religious composition 1897
Religion	1897	
Religion	amount	%
Protestants (Note: Excluding Anglicans)	7862	72.0
Eastern Orthodox	2403	22.0
Orthodox Old Believers	53	0.49
Roman Catholic	222	2.03
Jewish (Note: Including Karaites)	380	3.48
Muslims	1	0.001
Other Christian denominations (Note: Including Anglicans)	1	0.001
Other non-Christian denominations	0	0
Total	10922	100

== See also ==
- List of German exonyms for places in Estonia
- List of German exonyms for places in Latvia
