= Thorkill (Bishop of Reval) =

Thorkill (died 12 October 1260) was Bishop of Reval (modern-day Tallinn) 1238–1260.

Before becoming bishop, he was a priest in the Diocese of Ribe. Like the bishops after him, his appointment was strictly speaking uncanonical, as he was appointed by the Danish king, Valdemar II, and not the Pope. The king also bestowed estates on the bishop. His tenure was difficult, with conflicts both with his own vassals, neighbouring Russians, and the Teutonic Order. In addition, much of the Estonian population was still not fully Christianised. In 1242 he was in mainland Denmark and managed to get further financial support from the Danish king. Despite the challenges, Thorkill managed to set the conditions for an economically sustainable bishopric, even if many of his reforms would bear fruit only after his death. He also established parishes and promoted church building across Estonia, and supplied funding to two monasteries in Tallinn.

== Sources cited ==
- Bricka, Carl Frederik, ed. (1903). Dansk Biografisk Lexikon. XVII. BIND Svend Tveskjæg - Tøxen (in Danish). Vol. 17. Copenhagen: Gyldendalske Boghandels Forlag. pp. 265–266. OCLC 632818019.
- Rebane, P. Peter (1974). "The Danish Bishops of Tallinn, 1260–1346". Journal of Baltic Studies. 5 (4). Taylor & Francis: 315–328.
