= Kingdom of Livonia =

1570–1578 Russian client state in modern Estonia and Latvia

- 1570–1578
- Coat of arms

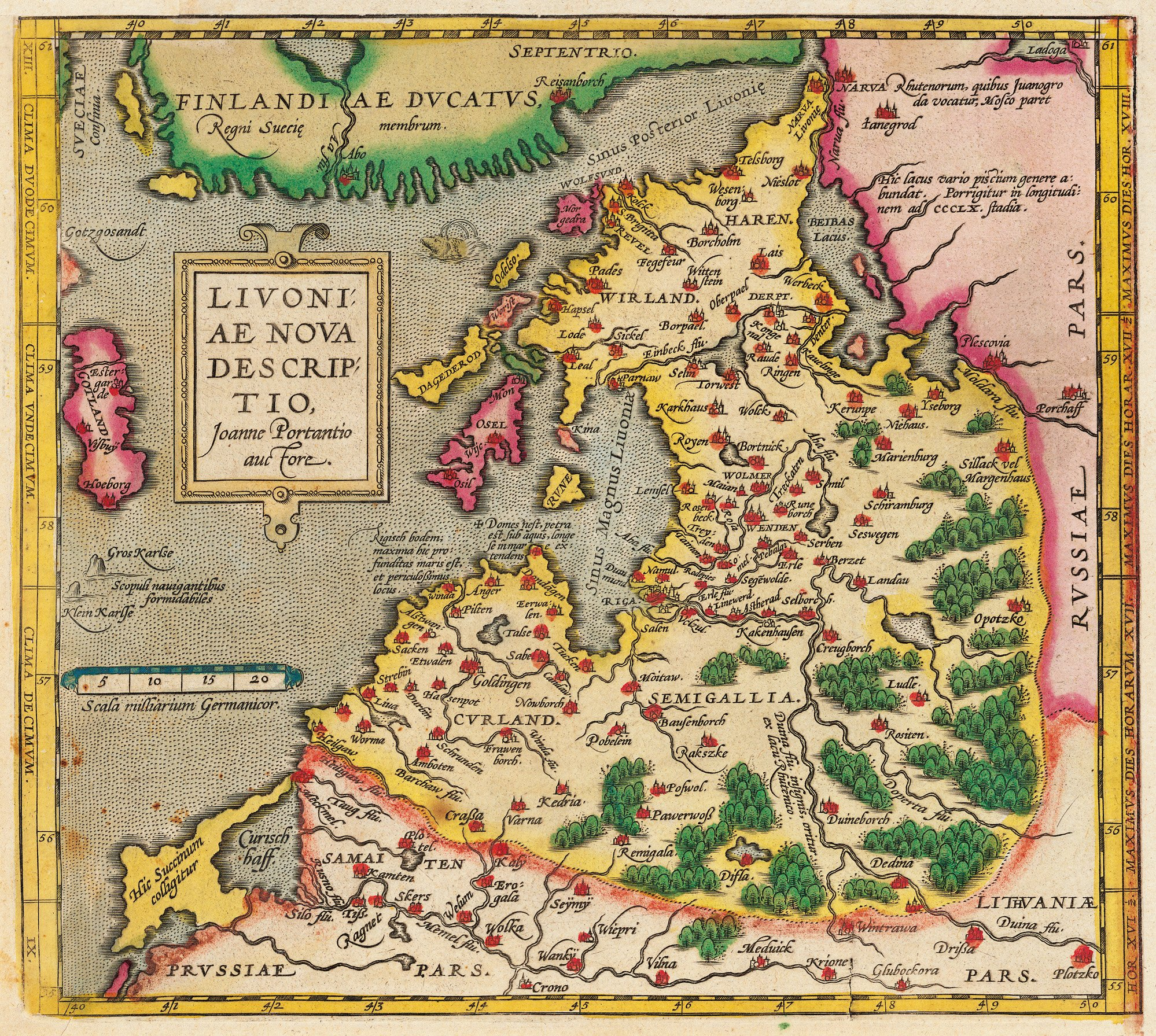
- Map of Livonia from Theatrum Orbis Terrarum (1573–1578)
- Status: Client state of Russia
- Capital: Pahlen
- Government: Monarchy
- King
  - 1570–1578: Magnus
- History
  - Established: 1570
  - Disestablished: 1578
Preceded by
Swedish Estonia
Duchy of Livonia
Duchy of Courland and Semigallia
Bishopric of Courland
Bishopric of Ösel–Wiek
Succeeded by
Swedish Estonia
Duchy of Livonia
Duchy of Courland and Semigallia

The Kingdom of Livonia (Note: German: Königreich Livland; Russian: Ливонское королевство, romanized: Livonskoye korolevstvo.) was a nominal state in what is now the territory of Estonia and Latvia. Russian tsar Ivan IV declared the establishment of the kingdom during the Livonian War of 1558–1583, but it never functioned properly as a polity.

In 1570, the Danish duke Magnus was crowned in Moscow as the king of Livonia. Magnus left Moscow with a Russian army with the intention of conquering Swedish-controlled Reval, but called off the siege in 1571 after failing to capture the city. Magnus eventually fell out of favour with Ivan and defected.

== History ==
The establishment of the kingdom as a Russian protectorate was likely due to the advice of two Livonian nobles, Johann Taube and Eilhard Kruse, as well as Ivan Viskovaty, the head of the foreign ministry. Magnus, Duke of Holstein, was quickly indentified as a suitable candidate for king.

On 10 June 1570, Magnus arrived in Moscow with the approval of his older brother Frederick II of Denmark, where he was crowned the king of Livonia. Magnus took the oath of allegiance to Ivan as his overlord. He received from him the corresponding charter for the vassal kingdom of Livonia in what Ivan termed his patrimony. The treaty between Magnus and Ivan IV was signed by an oprichnik and by a member of the zemsky administration, the dyak (clerk) Vasily Shchelkalov. The territories of the prospective new kingdom still had to be conquered, but nevertheless Põltsamaa Castle was proclaimed the future official residence of the king.

Sometime in mid-June, the Swedish delegation was banished to Murom. Ivan argued that Sweden was not a kingdom of equal rank to Russia, but rather a province with a status similar to that of the Livonian kingdom. On 6 July, the new king Magnus of Livonia departed from Moscow with 20,000 Russian soldiers for the conquest of Swedish-controlled Reval. Ivan's hope for the support of King Frederick II of Denmark, the older brother of Magnus, failed. By the end of March 1571, Magnus gave up the struggle for Reval and abandoned the siege.

In 1578, having lost Ivan's favor and getting no support from his brother, Magnus called on the Livonian nobility to rally to him in a struggle against foreign occupation. Ivan's forces attacked him and took him prisoner. On his release, he renounced his royal title. Most of Livonia was once again overrun by Russian troops, but a new infantry force was able to drive the Russians out of Wenden in October 1578. This was followed by an invasion of Russia in 1579 by Stephen Báthory with the goal of recapturing Polotsk.

The end of the Livonian War in August 1583 saw most of the territory of Old Livonia, including the Duchy of Courland and Semigallia and Duchy of Livonia, under the control of the Polish–Lithuanian Commonwealth, with Swedish control established in the Duchy of Estonia. Magnus spent the rest of his life at the castle of Pilten in the Bishopric of Courland, where he died as a pensioner of the Polish crown in March 1583.

== Bibliography ==
- Madariaga, Isabel de (25 September 2006). Ivan the Terrible. Yale University Press. ISBN 978-0-300-11973-2.
