= Olaf of Roskilde =

Olaf of Roskilde (also Olav; died 1350) was Bishop of Reval (modern-day Tallinn). He was appointed Bishop of Reval in 1324. He played a role in the events following the Saint George's Night Uprising, inviting the Teutonic Order to Danish Estonia to quell the rebellion. When Estonia was sold to the Teutonic Order three years later, Olaf was one of the witnesses of the contract.

== Biography ==
Olaf was named Bishop of Reval in 1323 by the King of Denmark, King Eric. His appointment, though uncanonical, was confirmed by Pope John XXII in Avignon in 1323. In parallel to the royal nomination of Olaf, the cathedral chapter in Tallinn had chosen its own candidate for the post, who instead was made Bishop of Chełmno by the Pope.

Olaf was consecrated in January 1324, and by 1326 had arrived in Estonia. Over the next years he appears to have travelled widely: in 1327 he was at Turaida Castle, in 1328 in Rostock and in 1329 in Copenhagen. Four years later, Olaf is mentioned in a document issued by the Bishop of Ösel–Wiek in connection with a local conflict between the regent of the Duchy (Marquard Breide) and Bishop Olaf.

Olaf of Roskilde played an important role in the events following the Saint George's Night Uprising and subsequent occupation of Danish Estonia by the Teutonic Order. At this time, the Danish crown had begun to see its Estonian possession as a liability rather than an asset, and was looking for ways to profitably get rid of it. In this context, Bishop Olaf invited the Teutonic Order to Estonia to quash the rebellion, restore order and occupy all castles. In a document dated 27 October 1343, the bishop argues that if he had not invited the Order, Christianity itself would have been in peril in Estonia. When the Danish crown finally sold Estonia to the Teutonic Order in 1346, Olaf was a witness to the contract. He remained in office after Estonia had ceased being Danish, until his death in 1350.

== Sources cited ==
- Rebane, P. Peter (1974). "The Danish Bishops of Tallinn, 1260–1346". Journal of Baltic Studies. 5 (4). Taylor & Francis: 315–328.
