= Roman Catholic Diocese of Reval =

Roman Catholic diocese in Livonia

Coordinates: 59°26′N 24°45′E

The Bishopric of Reval was a Latin Church ecclesiastical territory or diocese of the Catholic Church in Reval, Duchy of Estonia (Reval was the name of Tallinn until 1918) created by Valdemar II of Denmark in 1240. Contradictory to canon law, Valdemar II reserved the right to appoint the bishops of Reval to himself and his successor kings of Denmark. The decision to simply nominate the see of Reval was unique in the whole Catholic Church at the time and was disputed by bishops and the Pope. During the era, the election of bishops was never established in Reval and the royal rights to the bishopric and to nominate the bishops was even included in the treaty when the territories of the Duchy of Estonia were sold to Teutonic Order in 1346.

Until 1374 the see was suffragan to the Archbishop of Lund after which it was transferred to the Archbishopric of Riga.

The Bishopric of Reval came to an end during the Protestant Reformation in the Livonian Confederation. The last titular bishop of the see was Magnus, Duke of Holstein younger brother of Frederick II of Denmark who had bought Bishopric of Ösel-Wiek on the eve of the Livonian War. Magnus landed on Ösel (Saaremaa) in 1560 and soon after the bishop of Reval also resigned his bishopric to Magnus' hands. Magnus' attempt to gain control of the Toompea Castle in Reval was prevented by Gotthard Kettler, the master of Livonian Order. In 1561 Eric XIV of Sweden took control over Reval and after the Livonian war it became the capital city of Swedish Estonia.

== Bishops ==
=== Kingdom of Denmark ===
- Wesselin (1219–1227)
- Thorkill (1238/40-1260)
- Thrugot (1260/63-1279)
- Johannes (1280–1294)
- Heinrich, OFM (1298–1318)
- Olaf of Roskilde (1323–1350)

=== Ordensstaat ===
- Ludwig von Münster alias Ludovicus de Monasterio (1352–1389)
- Johannes Rekeling (1390–1403)
- Dietrich Theodor Tolke (1403–1405)
- Johannes von Aken-Achmann (Ochmann) (1405–1418)
- Arnold Stoltevoet (1418–1419)
- Heinrich Uexküll (1419–1456)
- Everhard Kalle (Call) (1457–1475)
- Iwan Stoltevoet (1475–1477)
- Simon von der Borch (1477–1492)
- Nikolaus Roddendorp (1493–1509)
- Gottschalk Hagen (1509–1513)
- Christian Czernekow (1513–1514)
- Johannes Blankenfeld (1514–1524) (also the Bischof von Dorpat and Erzbischof von Riga)
- Georg von Tiesenhausen (1525–1530)
- Johannes Roterd (1531–1536)
- Arnold Annebat (1536–1551)
- Friedrich von Ampten (1551–1557)
- Moritz (Mauritius) von Wrangel (1558–1560)

== See also ==
- Archbishopric of Riga
- Bishopric of Courland
- Bishopric of Dorpat
- Bishopric of Ösel-Wiek
- Livonian Order
- Roman Catholic Diocese of Tallinn

== Bibliography ==
- Skyum-Nielsen, Niels (1981). Danish Medieval History & Saxo Grammaticus. Museum Tusculanum Press. ISBN 87-88073-30-0.
