= Terra Mariana =

Vassal state of the Holy See

- 1207–1561
- Status: Principality of the Holy Roman Empire (1207–1215, 1526–1561); Vassal state of the Holy See (1215–1526)
- Capital: Riga (de facto); Walk (from 1435)
- Common languages: Latin (Note: In administrative and liturgical use); Low German; Livonian; Estonian; Latvian
- Religion: Roman Catholicism
- Government: Theocratic elective monarchy
- Legislature: Landtag
- Historical era: Middle Ages
  - Established: 1207
  - St. George's Night Uprising: 1343–1344
  - Landtag formed: 1419
  - Confederation Agreement: 4 December 1435
  - Treaty of Vilnius: 1561
- Currency: Artig, Denier, Schilling, Thaler
Succeeded by
Danish Øsel
Swedish Estonia
Duchy of Courland and Semigallia
Duchy of Livonia
- Today part of: Estonia; Latvia

Terra Mariana (Medieval Latin for 'Land of Mary') was the formal name for Medieval Livonia or Old Livonia. (Note: Referred to by historians as Medieval Livonia or Old Livonia to distinguish it from the rump-Livonia (Duchy of Livonia) and the Livonian Governorate that was formed from part of its territories after its breakup.) It was formed in the aftermath of the Livonian Crusade, and its territories were composed of present-day Estonia and Latvia. It was established on 2 February 1207, as a principality of the Holy Roman Empire, and lost this status in 1215 when Pope Innocent III proclaimed it as directly subject to the Holy See.

The papal legate William of Modena divided Terra Mariana into feudal principalities: the Duchy of Estonia (dominum directum to the king of Denmark); the Archbishopric of Riga; the Bishopric of Courland; the Bishopric of Dorpat; the Bishopric of Ösel–Wiek; and territories under the military administration of the Livonian Brothers of the Sword. After the 1236 Battle of Saule, the surviving members of the Brothers merged in 1237 with the Teutonic Order of Prussia and became known as the Livonian Order. In 1346 the Livonian Order bought the Duchy of Estonia from Denmark.

Throughout the existence of medieval Livonia there was a constant struggle over supremacy, between the lands ruled by the Church, the Order, the secular German nobility, and the citizens of the Hanseatic towns of Riga and Reval. Following its defeat in the Battle of Grunwald in 1410, the Teutonic Order and the State of the Teutonic Order fell into decline, but the Livonian Order managed to maintain its independent existence.

In 1561, during the Livonian War, Terra Mariana ceased to exist. Its northern parts were ceded to the King of Sweden and formed into the Duchy of Estonia, and its southern territories became part of the Grand Duchy of Lithuania – and thus eventually of the Polish–Lithuanian Commonwealth – as the Duchy of Livonia and the Duchy of Courland and Semigallia. The island of Saaremaa became part of Denmark. Since the beginning of the 20th century Terra Mariana (Estonian: Maarjamaa) has been used as a poetic name or sobriquet for Estonia. In 1995 the Order of the Cross of Terra Mariana, a state decoration, was instituted to honor the independence of Estonia. Terra Mariana (Latvian: Māras zeme) is also used as a poetic name for Latgale region.

== History ==
=== Livonian Crusade ===
The lands on the eastern shores of the Baltic Sea were the last part of Europe to be Christianized by the Roman Catholic Church. In 1193 Pope Celestine III called for a crusade against the pagans in Northern Europe. This crusade is often compared to the crusade of the Franks and Charlemagne. However, this crusade was not officially announced until 1197 or 1198, but the first account of this crusade is in a letter by Pope Innocent III. At the start of the 13th century, German crusaders from Gotland and the northern Holy Roman Empire conquered the Livonian and Latgallian lands along the Daugava and Gauja rivers. The stronghold of Riga (capital of modern Latvia) was established in 1201, and in 1202 the Livonian Brothers of the Sword was formed. In 1218 Pope Honorius III gave Valdemar II of Denmark free rein to annex as much land as he could conquer in Estonia. Additionally Albert of Riga, leader of the crusaders fighting the Estonians from the south, paid a visit to the German King Philip of Swabia and asked permission to attack the Estonians from the North. The last to be subjugated and Christianised were Oeselians, Curonians and Semigallians.

This crusade differed from many other crusades because, in this case, the Pope allowed people intending to go on a crusade to the Holy Land to go instead to crusade in Livonia. Members of this crusade were made to wear the insignia of the cross as well, which showed that they were legally bound to the crusade.

After the success of the crusade, the German- and Danish-occupied territory was divided into feudal principalities by William of Modena.

=== Establishment ===
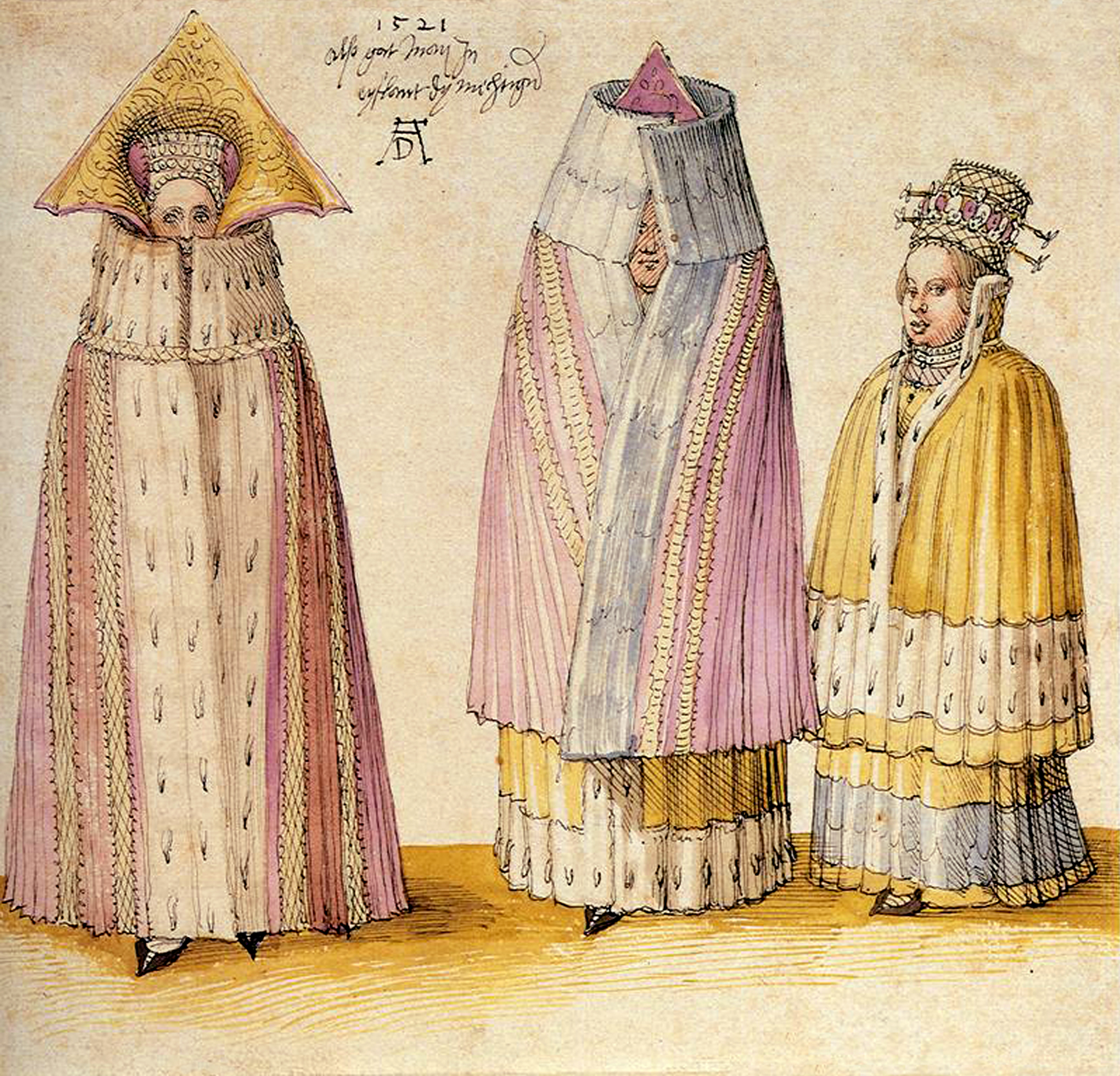
Three Mighty Ladies from Livonia by Albrecht Dürer (1521)

This division of medieval Livonia was created by Papal Legate William of Modena in 1228 as a compromise between the church and the Livonian Brothers of the Sword, both factions led by Germans, after the German knights had conquered and subdued the territories of several indigenous tribes: Finnic-speaking Estonians and Livs, and Baltic-speaking Latgalians, Selonians, Semigallians and Curonians.

Medieval Livonia was intermittently ruled first by the Brothers of the Sword, since 1237 by the semi-autonomous branch of Teutonic knights called Livonian Order and the Roman Catholic Church. By the mid 14th century, after buying the Duchy of Estonia from Christopher II, the Livonian Order controlled about 67,000 square kilometers of the Old Livonia and the Church about 41,000 km^{2} (16,000 sq mi). The lands of the Order were divided into about 40 districts governed by a Vogt. The largest ecclesiastical state was the Archbishopric of Riga (18,000 km^{2}, 6,900 sq mi) followed by the Bishopric of Courland (4,500 km^{2}, 1,700 sq mi), Bishopric of Dorpat, and Bishopric of Ösel-Wiek. The nominal head of Terra Mariana as well as the city of Riga was the Archbishop of Riga as the apex of the ecclesiastical hierarchy.

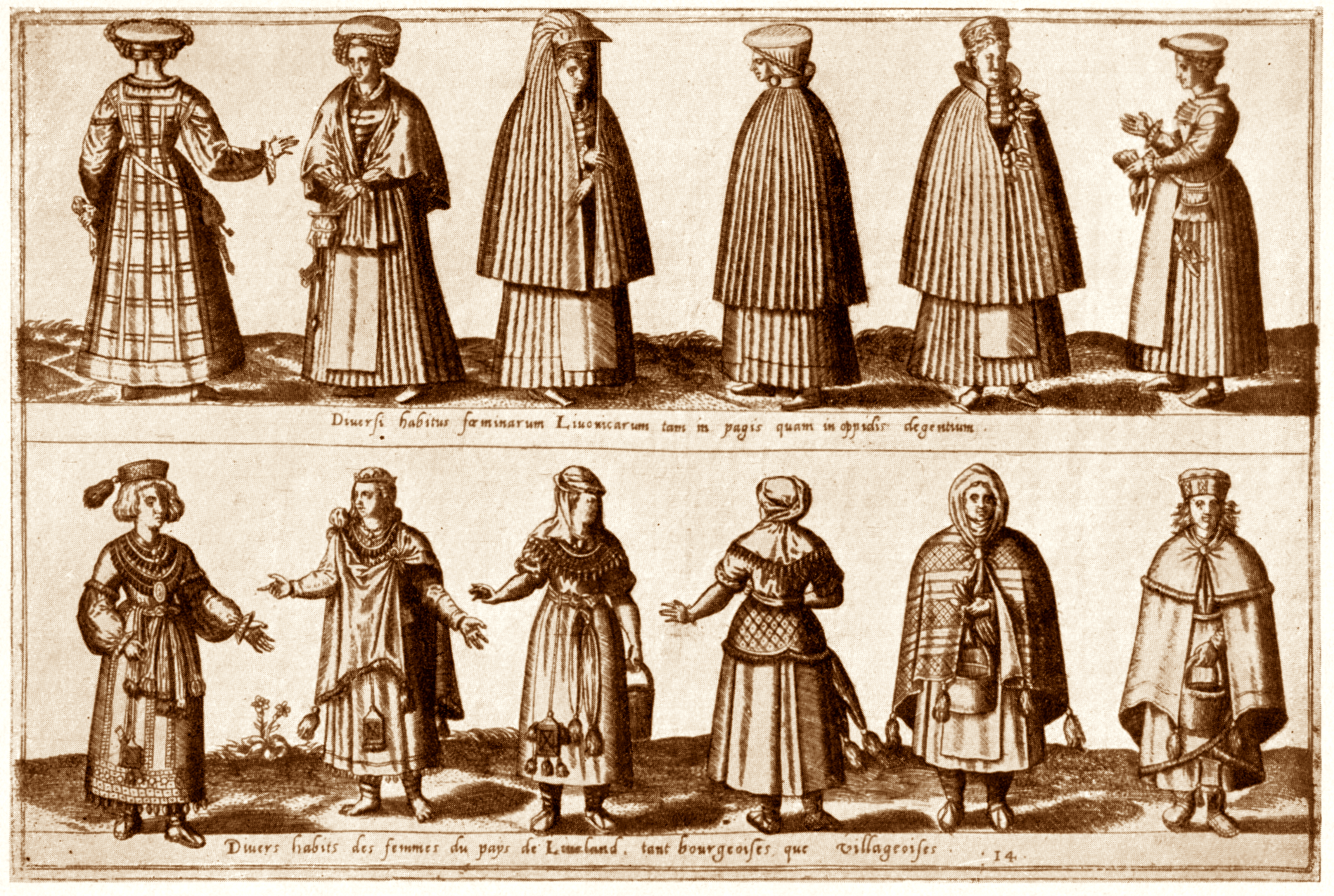
Citizens (upper panel) and commoners (lower panel) in medieval Livonia, 16th century

In 1240, Valdemar II created the Bishopric of Reval in the Duchy of Estonia by reserving (contrary to canon law) the right to appoint the bishops of Reval to himself and his successor kings of Denmark. The decision to simply nominate to the See of Reval was unique in the whole Catholic Church at the time and was disputed by bishops and the Pope. During this era, the election of bishops was never established in Reval, and the royal rights to the bishopric and to nominate the bishops were even included in the treaty when the territories were sold to the Teutonic Order in 1346.

=== Livonian civil wars ===
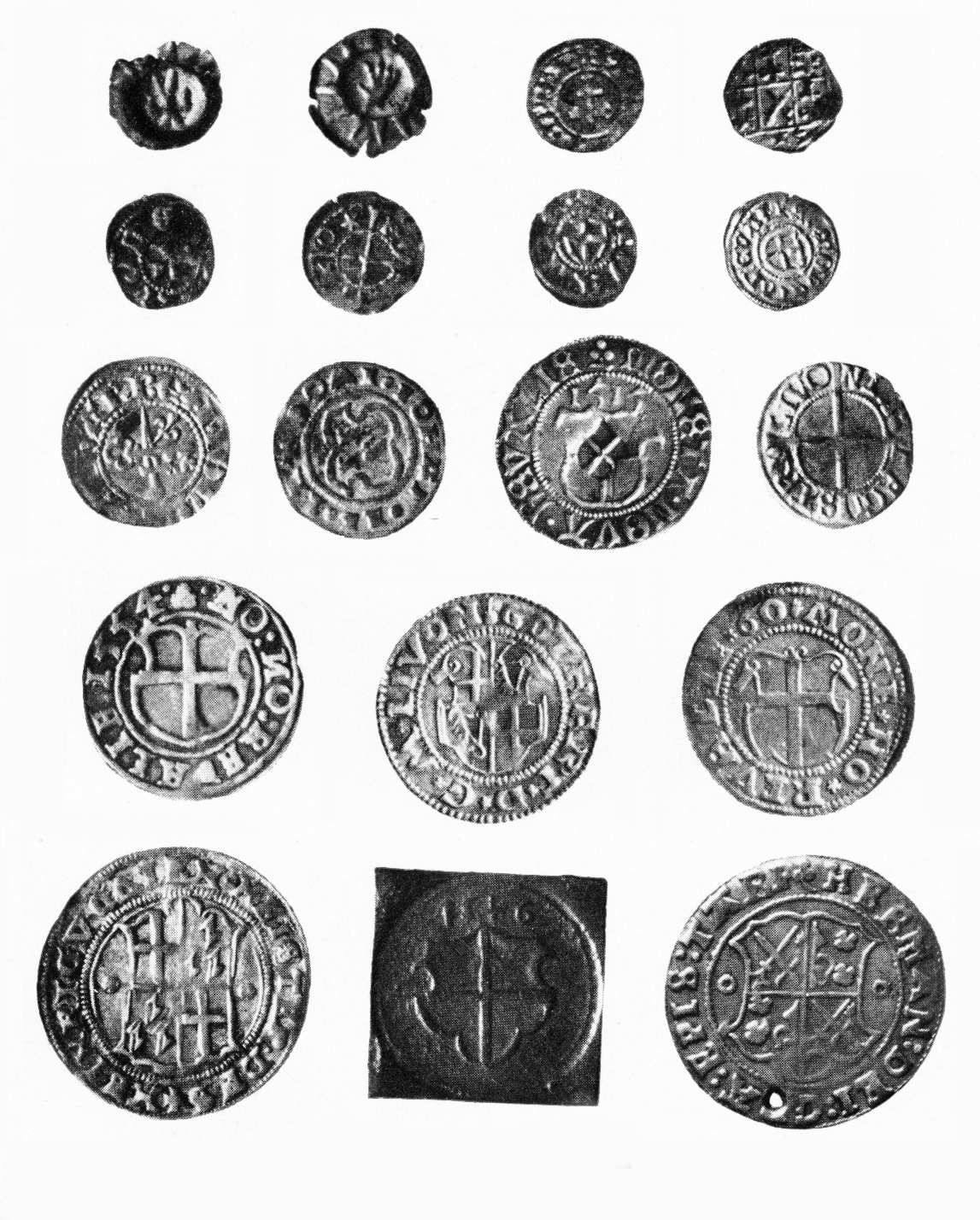
Coins of Medieval Livonia, 15th–16th century

Throughout the existence of medieval Livonia there was a constant struggle for superiority in the rule over the lands by the Church, the order, the secular nobles of German descent who ruled the fiefs and the citizens of the Hanseatic town of Riga. Two major civil wars were fought in 1296–1330, 1313–1330, and in 1343–1345 the Estonian revolt resulted in the annexation of the Danish Duchy of Estonia within the Teutonic Ordensstaat.

The most important ally of the Livonian Order was the German nobility in the Danish Duchy of Estonia. In the beginning of the 14th century Denmark was no longer a powerful state and the local German nobility had effectively become the rulers of the territory. After the Estonians of Harju started a rebellion in 1343 (St. George's Night Uprising) the Teutonic order occupied the territories. The overthrow of Danish rule came two days after the Order had defeated the Estonian revolt. The Danish viceroy was imprisoned in cooperation with the pro-German vassals. The castles in Reval and Wesenberg were handed over to the Order by the German nobility party on 16 May 1343 and the castle at Narva in 1345. In 1346, the Estonian territories (Harria and Vironia) were sold by the king of Denmark for 19,000 Köln marks to the Teutonic Order. The shift of sovereignty from Denmark to the Teutonic Order took place on 1 November 1346.

=== Livonian Confederation ===
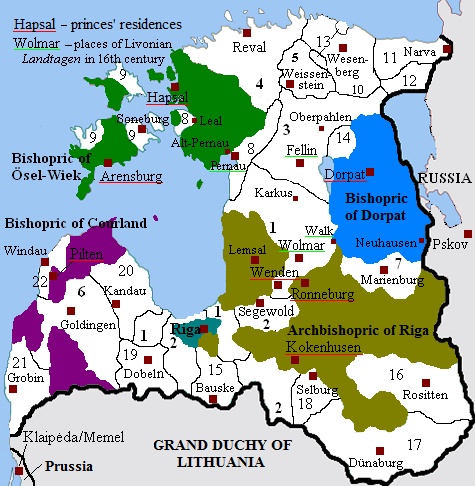
Old Livonia, before the Livonian War: Livonian Order Bishopric of Courland Bishopric of Ösel–Wiek Bishopric of Dorpat City of Riga Archbishopric of Riga

The Teutonic Order fell into decline after Poland and Lithuania defeated it in the Battle of Grunwald in 1410. The Livonian Order managed to maintain an independent existence, as it did not participate in the battle and suffered no casualties, having obtained a truce with Grand Duke Vytautas.

In 1418, Pope Martin V nominated Johannes Ambundii to the position of Archbishop of Riga. He became known as the organizer of the Livonian confederation.

Conflict commonly occurred between the Order, the bishops, and the powerful Hanseatic cities throughout the existence of medieval Livonia. To solve internal disputes, the Livonian Diet or Landtag gathered in 1419 at the initiative of Archbishop Ambundii. The city of Walk was chosen as the site of the Diet. The Diet comprised members of the Livonian Order, Livonian Bishops, vassals and city representatives.

On 1 September 1435 the Livonian Order's defeat in the Battle of Wiłkomierz, claiming the lives of the Master and several high-ranking knights, brought the order closer to its Livonian neighbours. The Livonian confederation agreement (eiine fruntliche eyntracht) was signed in Walk on 4 December 1435, by the archbishop of Riga, the bishops of Courland, Dorpat, Ösel-Wiek and Reval; the representatives of the Livonian Order and vassals, and the deputies of Riga, Reval and Dorpat city municipal councils.

The states of the Livonian Confederation ceased to exist during the Livonian War of 1558–1582. In 1559, the Bishop of Ösel-Wiek and Courland Johannes V von Münchhausen (1542–1560) sold his lands to King Frederick II of Denmark for 30,000 thalers. The Danish king gave the territory to his younger brother Duke Magnus of Holstein who in 1560 landed with an army on Ösel.

In 1561, a Swedish army landed in Reval and gained control over the northern part of Old Livonia. The Livonian Order was dissolved by the Treaty of Vilnius in 1561. The following year, the Livonian Diet decided to ask protection from Sigismund II Augustus. With the end of government by the last Archbishop of Riga, William of Brandenburg, Riga became a free imperial city and the rest of the territory was split between two Polish-Lithuanian vassal states: the Duchy of Courland and Semigallia (Polish vassal) and the Duchy of Livonia (Lithuanian vassal).

== Nomenclature ==
According to Henry of Livonia, Bishop Albert of Riga emphasized to Pope Innocent III the importance of his see as a crusading venue and its association with Mary, the Mother of Jesus when reporting to the Fourth Lateran Council in 1215:

"Sicut", inquit, "pater sancte, terram sanctam Ierosolimitanum, que est terra filii, sanctitatis tue studio fovere non desinis, sic Lyvoniam, que est terra matris, [...] derelinquere non debes." "Holy Father", he said, "as you have not ceased to cherish the Holy Land of Jerusalem, the country of the Son, [...] so also you ought not to abandon Livonia, the land of the Mother [...]

== In popular culture ==
"Terra Mariana" appears as an achievement in the historical strategy video game Europa Universalis IV.

== See also ==
- Kingdom of Livonia
- Üxküll (Ikšķile)
- Northern Crusades
