= Bishopric of Courland =

Baltic ecclesiastical state (1254–1562)

Coordinates: 57.2172°N 21.7028°E

Bishopric of Courland Episcopatus Curoniensis (Latin) Bisdom Curland (Low German)
- 1234–1562
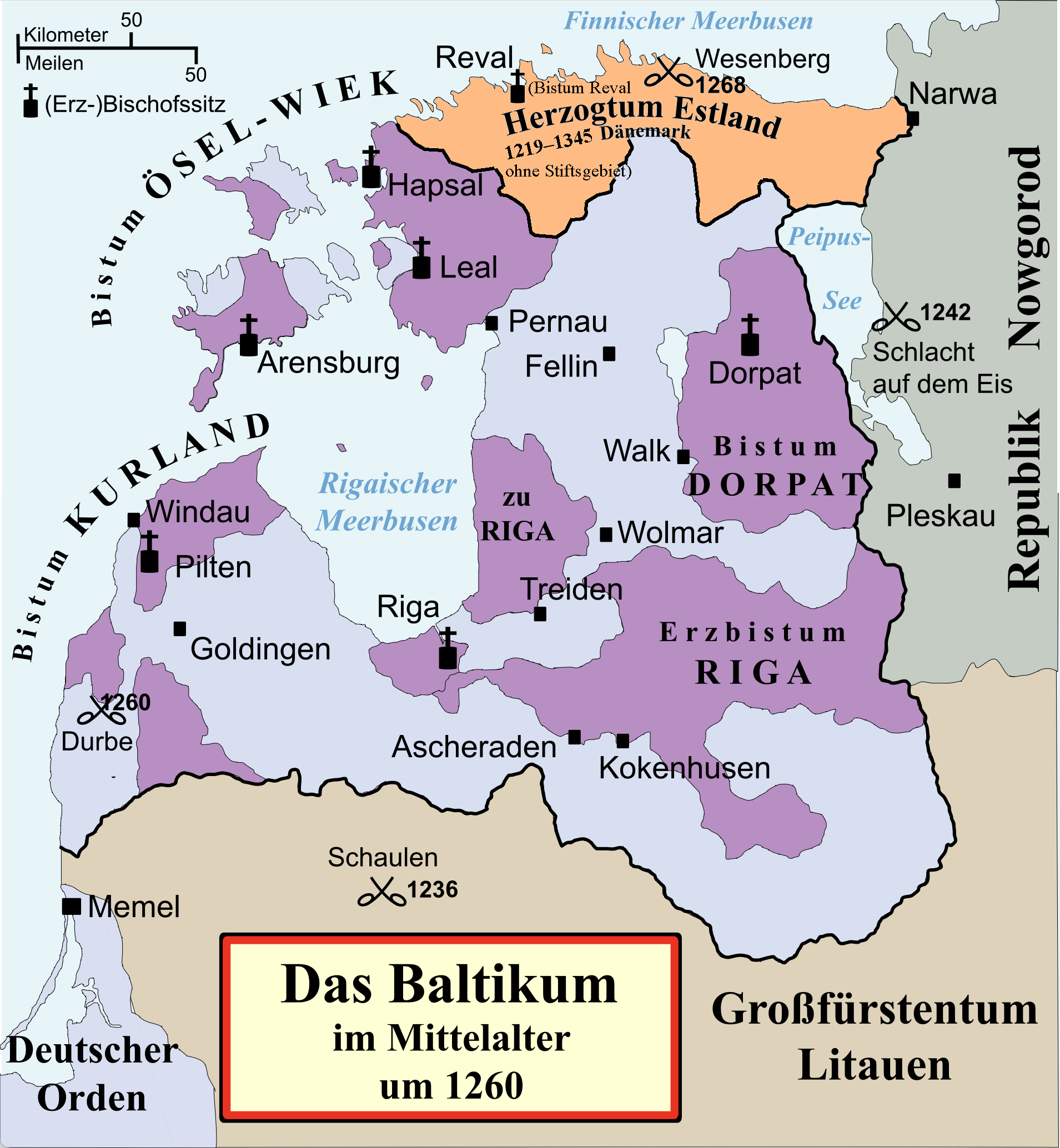
- The Livonian Confederation 1260.
- Capital: Piltene
- Common languages: Latin; Low German; Curonian
- Religion: Roman Catholic
- Government: Prince-Bishopric
- Bishop of Courland
  - 1234–1236/37: Engelbert (1st)
  - 1560–1583: Magnus (last)
- History
  - Established: 11 February 1234
  - Disestablished: 20 April 1562
  - Treaty of Kronborg: 20 April 1585
- Currency: Ferding, Schilling
Succeeded by
Duchy of Courland and Semigallia; Kingdom of Livonia

The Bishopric of Courland (Latin: Episcopatus Curoniensis, Low German: Bisdom Curland) was the second smallest (4500 km^{2}) ecclesiastical state in the Livonian Confederation founded in the aftermath of the Livonian Crusade. During the Livonian War in 1559 the bishopric became a possession of Denmark, and in 1585 sold by Denmark to Poland–Lithuania.

== History ==
In ancient times a Baltic tribe, the Curonians, inhabited Courland and had strong links with the maritime tribes in both sides of the Baltic sea. In 1230, Lamekinas, Duke of West Courland, signed an agreement with the vice-legat Baldwin of Alna (Baudoin d’Aulne) of the Pope Gregory IX about the voluntary conversion of his people to Christianity and receiving the same rights as the inhabitants of Gotland.

In 1234 Dominican friar Engelbert was appointed to be the first bishop of Courland. In 1242 the area of Courland passed under the influence of the Teutonic Knights owing to the amalgamation of this order with that of the Brethren of the Sword in 1237. In 1253 the territory of Courland was divided between the Bishopric of Courland and the Livonian branch of the Order of Teutonic Knights. After severe defeat of knights in the Battle of Durbe the Bishop Heinrich von Lützelburg left Courland in 1263 and the new bishop Edmund of Werth returned in his bishopric only after suppression of Curonian and Semigallian insurgencies in 1290.

During the Livonian War (1558–1582), under the increasing pressure of the Tsardom of Russia, the Livonian Confederation dissolved. In 1559 the Bishop of Courland and Ösel-Wiek Johann V von Münchhausen sold his lands to King Frederick II of Denmark for 30,000 thalers. The Danish king gave the territory to his younger brother Duke Magnus of Holstein. Duke Magnus was crowned King of Livonia in 1570. In 1577, having lost Ivan's favor and receiving no support from his brother, Magnus called on the Livonian nobility to rally to him in a struggle against foreign occupation. He was attacked by Ivan's forces and taken prisoner. On his release, he renounced his royal title.

Magnus spent the last six years of his life at the castle of Pilten, where he died as a pensioner of the Polish crown. He promised to transfer it to the Duchy of Courland after his death, but this plan failed and only later Wilhelm Kettler did regain this district. After Magnus of Livonia died in 1583, Polish–Lithuanian Commonwealth invaded his territories in the Duchy of Courland and Frederick II of Denmark decided to sell his rights of inheritance.

== Chronology ==
- September 1234: Bishopric of Courland (Bistum Kurland) established (formally declared on 11 February 1232), consisting of three separate enclaves after numerous distributions of the Curonian lands among the Bishops of Courland, and of Riga, and the Teutonic Order.
- 1290: The cathedral chapter is incorporated into the Teutonic Order lands, the bishopric is subjected to the Order.
- 1341: The bishops were also rulers of the island of Runö (now Ruhnu in SW-Estonia) from at least 1341.
- 1520: Made a sovereign principality (prince-bishopric) of the Holy Roman Empire (formally from January 1521), but style of prince not used.
- 20 May 1560: Sold to the King of Denmark, given as an appanage (Stift Kurland) to Magnus Herzog von Holstein, the brother of the king Frederick II of Denmark.
- 1578: Bishop Magnus accepts sovereignty of the Polish–Lithuanian Commonwealth (not ratified by the Sejm of Poland–Lithuania, nor recognized by Denmark).
- 20 April 1585: Sold by Denmark to Poland–Lithuania according to the Treaty of Kronborg.

== Bishops of Courland ==
Name	From	To
Engelbert, Dominican Order	1234	1236/37
Hermann I	1245	1250
Heinrich I of Lützelburg, Franciscan	1251	1263
Edmund of Werth, Teutonic Order	1263	1292
Burkhard, Teutonic Order	1300	1321?
Paul I, Teutonic Order	1322	1330/32?
Johann I of Courland	1328	1331/32
Johann II, Teutonic Order	1332	1353
Ludolf, Teutonic Order	1354	1359?
Jacob, Teutonic Order	1360	1371?
Otto, Teutonic Order	1371	1398?
Rutger von Brüggenei, Teutonic Order	1399	1404?
Gottschalk Schutte, Teutonic Order	1405	1424
Dietrich Tanke, Teutonic Order	1424	1425
Johann III Tiergart, Teutonic Order	1425	1456
Paul II Einwald	1457	1473
Martin Lewitz	1473	1500
Michael Sculteti	1500	1500
Heinrich II Basedow	1501	1523
Hermann II Ronneberg	1524	1540
Johann V von Münchhausen	1540	1560
Magnus of Livonia	1560	1583

== See also ==
- Archbishopric of Riga
- Bishopric of Dorpat
- Bishopric of Ösel-Wiek
- Bishopric of Reval
- Courland
- Couronian colonization
- Couronian colonization of the Americas
- Duchy of Courland and Semigallia
- Kingdom of Livonia
- Livonian Brothers of the Sword
