= Piltene =

Town in Ventspils Municipality, Latvia

Piltene Livonian: Piltõn
- Town
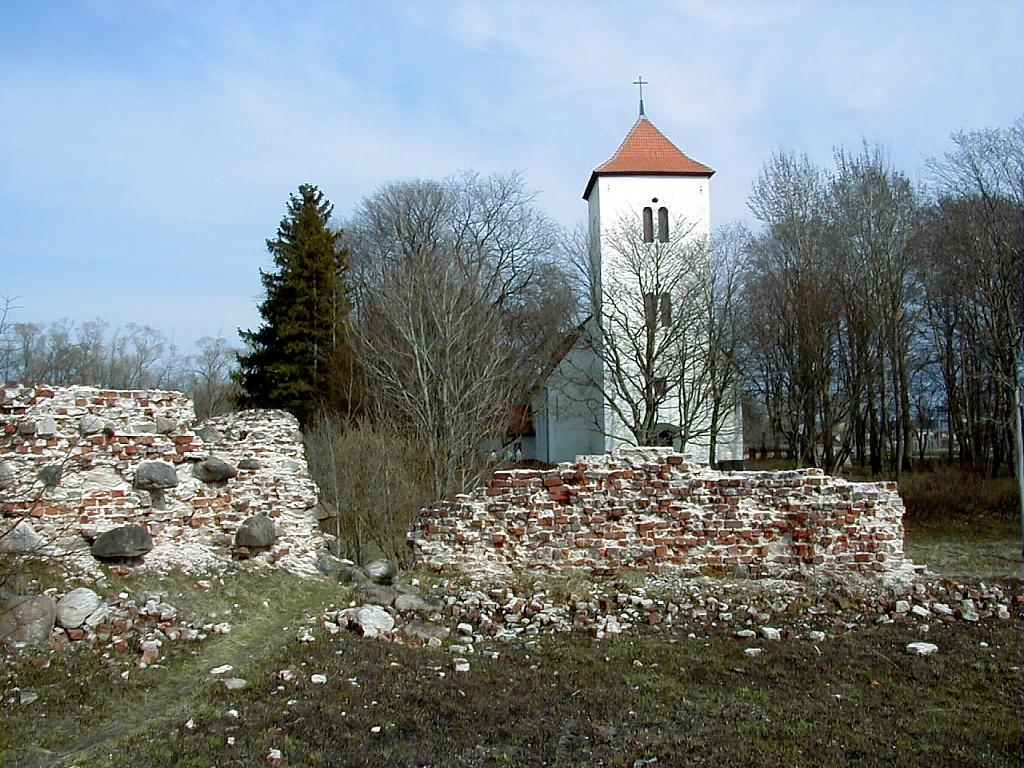
- Ruins of the church in Piltene

- Flag Coat of arms

- Location in Latvia
- Coordinates: 57°13′N 21°40′E
- Country: Latvia
- District: Ventspils district
- Town rights: 1557

Area
  - Total: 5.52 km^{2} (2.13 sq mi)
  - Land: 5.35 km^{2} (2.07 sq mi)
  - Water: 0.17 km^{2} (0.066 sq mi)

Population (2026)
  - Total: 809
  - Density: 151/km^{2} (392/sq mi)
- Time zone: UTC+2 (EET)
  - Summer (DST): UTC+3 (EEST)
- Postal code: LV-3620
- Calling code: +371 636
- Website: Official website at the Wayback Machine (archived 2008-05-28)

Piltene (Livonian: Piltõn, Polish: Piltyń, German: Pilten) is a town in Ventspils Municipality, in the Courland region of Latvia. The population in 2020 was 909.

The ruins of Piltene Castle are located in Piltene.

== Population ==
Historical population

Year	Pop.	±%
1989	1,929	—
2000	1,800	−6.7%
2001	1,817	+0.9%
2002	1,804	−0.7%
2003	1,778	−1.4%
2004	1,776	−0.1%

Year	Pop.	±%
2005	1,738	−2.1%
2006	1,736	−0.1%
2007	1,717	−1.1%
2008	1,705	−0.7%
2009	1,683	−1.3%
2016	964	−42.7%

Population (Year): 40,000 (1795)

== History ==
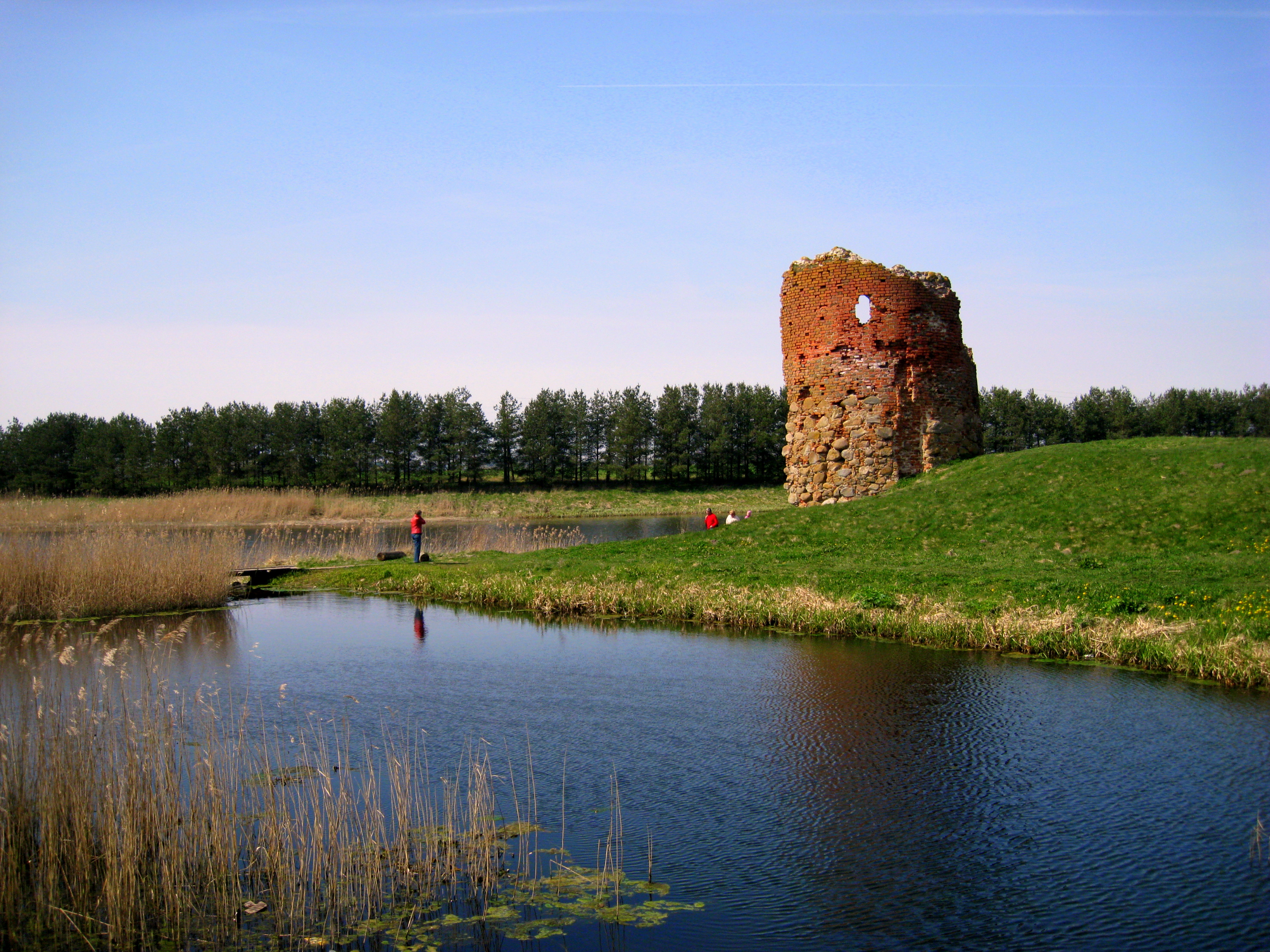
Ruins of Piltene Castle

- 1220: King Valdemar II of Denmark erects a castle on the site.
- September 1234: Bishopric of Courland (Bistum Kurland) established (formally declared on 11 February 1232), consisting of three separate enclaves after numerous distributions of the Couronian lands among the Bishops of Courland, and of Riga, and the Teutonic Order.

Note: the bishops were also rulers of the island of Runö (now Ruhnu in southwest Estonia) from at least 1341.

- 1290: The cathedral chapter is incorporated into the Teutonic Order lands, the bishopric is subjected to the Order.
- 1520: Made a sovereign principality (prince-bishopric) of the Holy Roman Empire (formally from January 1521), but style of prince not used.
- 20 May 1560: Sold to the King of Denmark, given as an appanage (Stift Kurland) to the brother of the King, Magnus, Duke of Holstein.
- 1578: Bishop Magnus accepts sovereignty of Poland–Lithuania (not ratified by the Diet of Poland–Lithuania, or recognized by Denmark).
- 20 April 1585: Sold by Denmark to Poland–Lithuania.
- 17 June 1585: Informal subdivisions established: Pilten (administered by pledges to 1660), Dondangen (Polish "throne fief" to 1795) and Amboten (Polish "throne fief" to 16..).
- 28 October 1611: Incorporation into Poland–Lithuania as the district of Pilten (German: Kreis Pilten, Polish: Powiat Piltynski) as part of Polish Livonia declared (not effected).
- 9 May 1617: Bishopric of Pilten (Stift Pilten) in personal (actually subordinated) union with Poland–Lithuania.
- 1656: The rights of pledge bought by the Duke of Courland.
- 3 May 1660: Fief of Poland–Lithuanian to the Duke of Courland.
- 25 February 1661: Formal personal union with Courland.
- 1701 - 1709: Occupied by Sweden (1705 - 1706 interrupted by Russian occupation).
- 1717: Personal union with the Commonwealth restored.
- 28 March 1795: Pilten Landtag approves annexation to Russia, suzerainty of Poland–Lithuania declared void.
- 26 April 1795: Annexed by Russia, autonomy guaranteed.
- 28 January 1796: Autonomy abolished, fully incorporated into Courland.
- 1 February 1797: Local autonomy restored, within the province of Courland.
- July 1812 - November 1812: Occupied by France and made part of the Duchy of Courland, Semigallia and Pilten.
- 2 March 1818: Fully incorporated into Courland.
