= Magnus, Duke of Holstein =

Danish prince, Prince-bishop of Ösel, King of Livonia

Magnus of Denmark
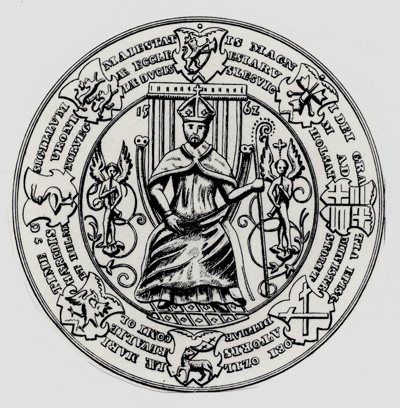
- Seal of Magnus of Denmark

Bishop of Ösel-Wiek
- Reign: 1560–1572

Bishop of Courland
- Reign: 1560–1583

King of Livonia (nominal)
- Reign: 1570–1578
- Born: 5 September 1540; Copenhagen Castle, Denmark
- Died: 28 March 1583 (aged 42); Pilten, Courland and Semigallia (now Piltene, Latvia)
- Burial: Pilten (1583); Roskilde Cathedral (1662)
- Spouse: Maria Vladimirovna of Staritsa
- Issue: Marie of Oldenburg; Eudoxia of Oldenburg
- House: House of Oldenburg
- Father: King Christian III of Denmark
- Mother: Dorothea of Saxe-Lauenburg
- Religion: Lutheranism

Magnus of Denmark or Magnus of Holstein (5 September [O.S. 26 August] 1540 – 28 March [O.S. 18 March] 1583) was a Prince of Denmark, Duke of Holstein, and a member of the House of Oldenburg. As a vassal of Tsar Ivan IV of Russia, he was the titular King of Livonia from 1570 to 1578.

== Early life ==
Duke Magnus was born at the Copenhagen Castle in 1540 as the second son of King Christian III of Denmark and Norway and Dorothea of Saxe-Lauenburg. At the age of 17 he was sent to Germany to be educated at various German courts. Following the death of his father in 1559, he returned to Denmark for the coronation of his older brother, King Frederick II of Denmark.

The same year, the prince-bishop of Ösel-Wiek and Courland Johannes V von Münchhausen in Old Livonia sold his lands to King Frederick II for 30,000 thalers. To avoid hereditary partition of his lands, King Frederick II gave that territory to his younger brother Magnus on condition that he renounced his rights to succession in the duchies of Schleswig and Holstein. In 1560, Magnus landed with an army on Ösel where he was immediately elected bishop by the cathedral chapter.

== King of Livonia ==
During the Livonian War, on 10 June 1570, Duke Magnus arrived in Moscow with the approval of his older brother, where he was crowned King of Livonia by Ivan IV of Russia. Magnus took the oath of allegiance to Ivan as his overlord and received from the corresponding charter for the vassal kingdom of Livonia in what Ivan termed his patrimony. The treaty between Magnus and Ivan IV was signed by an oprichnik and by a member of the zemskii administration, the dyak Vasily Shchelkalov. The territories of the new kingdom still had to be conquered, but even so Põltsamaa Castle was proclaimed the future official residence of the king.

The newly crowned king Magnus of Livonia left Moscow with 20,000 Russian soldiers with the intention of conquering Swedish-controlled Reval. Ivan's hope of the support of Frederick II of Denmark, the older brother of Magnus, failed. By the end of March 1571, Magnus gave up the struggle for Reval and abandoned the siege.

In 1577, having lost Ivan's favor and receiving no support from his brother, Magnus called on the Livonian nobility to rally to him in a struggle against foreign occupation. He was attacked by Ivan's forces and taken prisoner. On his release, he renounced his royal title. Magnus gave the rights to the throne to the genus of Stephen Báthory.

Magnus spent the last six years of his life at the castle of Pilten in the Bishopric of Courland, where he died as a pensioner of the Polish crown.

In 1662, Magnus' body was returned to Denmark and was reburied in the Roskilde Cathedral.

== Spouse and issue ==
On 12 April 1574, he married Maria Vladimirovna of Staritsa, daughter of Vladimir of Staritsa, Duke of Staritsa. His issue included:

- Marie of Oldenburg (c. July 1580 – c. 1597)
- Eudoxia of Oldenburg (c. 1581 – c. 1588)

== Ancestry ==
Ancestors of Magnus, Duke of Holstein

16. Theodoric, Count of Oldenburg
8. Christian I of Denmark
17. Hedvig of Holstein
4. Frederick I of Denmark
18. John, Margrave of Brandenburg-Kulmbach
9. Dorothea of Brandenburg
19. Barbara of Saxe-Wittenberg
2. Christian III of Denmark
20. Albrecht III, Elector of Brandenburg
10. John Cicero, Elector of Brandenburg
21. Margaret of Baden
5. Anna of Brandenburg
22. William III, Duke of Luxembourg
11. Margaret of Thuringia
23. Anne, Duchess of Luxembourg
1. Magnus of Denmark, King of Livonia
24. Bernhard II, Duke of Saxe-Lauenburg
12. John V, Duke of Saxe-Lauenburg
25. Adelheid of Pomerania
6. Magnus I, Duke of Saxe-Lauenburg
26. Frederick II, Elector of Brandenburg
13. Dorothea of Brandenburg
27. Catherine of Saxony
3. Dorothea of Saxe-Lauenburg
28. William IV, Duke of Brunswick-Lüneburg
14. Henry IV, Duke of Brunswick-Lüneburg
29. Elisabeth of Stolberg-Wernigerode
7. Catherine of Brunswick-Wolfenbüttel
30. Eric II, Duke of Pomerania
15. Catherine of Pomerania-Wolgast
31. Sophia of Pomerania-Stargard

== See also ==
- List of rulers of Schleswig-Holstein

== Bibliography ==
- Madariaga, Isabel de (25 September 2006). Ivan the Terrible. Yale University Press. ISBN 978-0-300-11973-2.

Preceded by Christian III of Denmark	Duke of Schleswig, Holstein, Stormarn, Dithmarschen, Lauenburg & Oldenburg; 1559	Succeeded by Frederick II of Denmark
Preceded by Johann V von Münchhausen	Bishop of Ösel-Wiek; 1560–1572	Succeeded by Denmark-Norway
Preceded by Johann IV von Münchhausen	Bishop of Courland; 1560–1583	Succeeded by Denmark-Norway–Polish–Lithuanian Commonwealth
Preceded by Commonwealth of Both Nations	King of Livonia (nominal); 1570–1578	Succeeded by Polish–Lithuanian Commonwealth
