= List of World War I puppet states =

During World War I a number of countries were conquered and controlled. Some of these countries were subsequently given new names and new government leaders loyal to the conquering country. These countries are known as puppet states. Germany and the Ottoman Empire were the two countries with puppet states. The Allies had many more puppet states than all the Central Powers collectively: the United Kingdom had the largest empire in the world.

In addition, several countries captured land in the years leading up to the war, which then became puppet states; those states which are immediately relevant to the war are also included here.

== Central Powers ==
=== German Empire ===
The German Empire had a number of puppet states during World War I. All the states were previously under Russian control and had long been of interest to the regime.

Puppet states created before World War I
Puppet states created during World War I

Created	Disestablished	Puppet State	Flag	Country/territory	Notes
November 5, 1916	November 11, 1918	Kingdom of Poland: Polish: Królestwo Polskie; German: Königreich Polen		Poland	The Central Powers' forces occupied Russian Congress Poland in 1915 and in 1916 the German Empire and Austria-Hungary created a Polish Monarchy in order to exploit the occupied territories in an easier way and mobilize the Poles against the Russians (see Polish Legions). In 1918 the state became independent and formed the backbone of the new internationally recognized Second Polish Republic.
February 16, 1918	November 9, 1918	Kingdom of Lithuania: Lithuanian: Lietuvos Karalystė; German: Königreich Litauen		Lithuania	After Russia's defeat and the territorial cessions of the Treaty of Brest-Litovsk, the Germans established a Lithuanian kingdom. However it became an independent republic with Germany's defeat.
March 8, 1918	November 18, 1918	Duchy of Courland and Semigallia: German: Herzogtum Kurland und Semgallen; Latvian: Kurzemes un Zemgales hercogiste		Latvia	In 1915 the Imperial German forces occupied the Russian Courland Governorate and the Treaty of Brest-Litovsk ended the war in the east, so the local ethnic Baltic Germans established a Duchy under the German crown from that part of Ober Ost, with a common return of civil administration in favor of military. This state was very swiftly merged with the Baltic State Duchy, and German-occupied territories of Russian Empire in Livonia and Estonia, into a multi-ethnic United Baltic Duchy.
March 9, 1918	Government in exile (since 1919)	Belarusian Democratic Republic: Belarusian: Беларуская Народная Рэспубліка		Belarus	
April 29, 1918	December 14, 1918	Ukrainian State: Ukrainian: Українська Держава		Ukraine	It was created by a right-wing coup which deposed the Socialist Central Rada.
May 26, 1918	February 25, 1921	Democratic Republic of Georgia: Georgian: საქართველოს დემოკრატიული რესპუბლიკა		Georgia	
June 25, 1918	April 2, 1919	Crimean Regional Government: Russian: Крымское краевое правительство		Crimea	
September 22, 1918	November 28, 1918	United Baltic Duchy: German: Vereinigtes Baltisches Herzogtum; Estonian: Balti Hertsogiriik; Latvian: Apvienotā Baltijas hercogiste		Latvia and Estonia	

=== Ottoman Empire ===
Puppet states created before World War I
Puppet states created during World War I
Puppet states created after the conclusion of World War I, but as a direct result of fighting

Created	Disestablished	Puppet State	Flag	Country/territory	Notes
August 31, 1913	October 25, 1913	Provisional Government of Western Thrace: Turkish: Garbi Trakya Hükûmet-i Müstakilesi; Greek: Προσωρινή Κυβέρνηση Δυτικής Θράκης		Kingdom of Bulgaria	Was a provisional republic which was established by the Turkish minority in Thrace, after the Ottoman Empire lost its lands in this region. It was the product of the Ottoman intelligence agency, Teşkilat-ı Mahsusa, in terms of organizational structure and organizers, and they had remarkably common characteristics with the other Turkish puppet government.
6 March, 1917	30 November, 1922	Mountainous Republic of the Northern Caucasus: Turkish: Kuzey Kafkasya Dağlık Cumhuriyeti			
May 28, 1918	April 28, 1920	Azerbaijan Democratic Republic: Azerbaijani: Azərbaycan Demokratik Cümhuriyyəti		Azerbaijan	
December 1, 1918	April 19, 1919	Provisional National Government of the Southwestern Caucasus: Turkish: Güneybatı Kafkas Geçici Milli Hükûmeti; Azerbaijani: Cənub-Qərbi Qafqaz Cümhuriyyəti		Caucasus Viceroyalty	Was a provisional republic which was established by the Turkish minority in the Caucasus, after the Ottoman Empire lost its lands in this region. It was the product of the Ottoman intelligence agency, Teşkilat-ı Mahsusa, in terms of organizational structure and organizers, and they had remarkably common characteristics with the other Turkish puppet government.

== Allies ==
=== France ===
Created	Disestablished	Puppet State	Flag	Country/territory	Notes
December 10, 1916	June 15, 1920	Autonomous Province of Korçë: Albanian: Krahina Autonome e Korçës; French: République de Koritza		Albania	It was founded without involvement of the former pro-Entente prime minister Essad Toptani.

== Others ==
These countries were not under the control of the warring parties, but were created during the war. Specific countries were created for individual needs.

Puppet states created during World War I

Created	Disestablished	Puppet State	Flag	Country/territory	Notes
February, 1918	March 20, 1918	Donetsk-Krivoy Rog Republic: Russian: Донецко-Криворожская советская республика; Ukrainian: Донецько-Криворізька Радянська Республіка		Soviet Russia	See also: DPRR-Soviet Russia relations The state, remotely controlled by Soviet Russia, was founded by Joseph Stalin's close friend Fyodor Artyom in 1918. But the DKRR was disliked by Vladimir Lenin. The capital of the republic was soon overthrown by the Germans again, and after the Soviet Red Army regained control of the territory, the country was dissolved at Lenin's request.
