= Lithuania District =

Administrative division of the German Empire

Lithuania District Verwaltungsbezirk Litauen
- Military occupation authority of the German Empire
- 1915–1918
- Flag Coat of arms

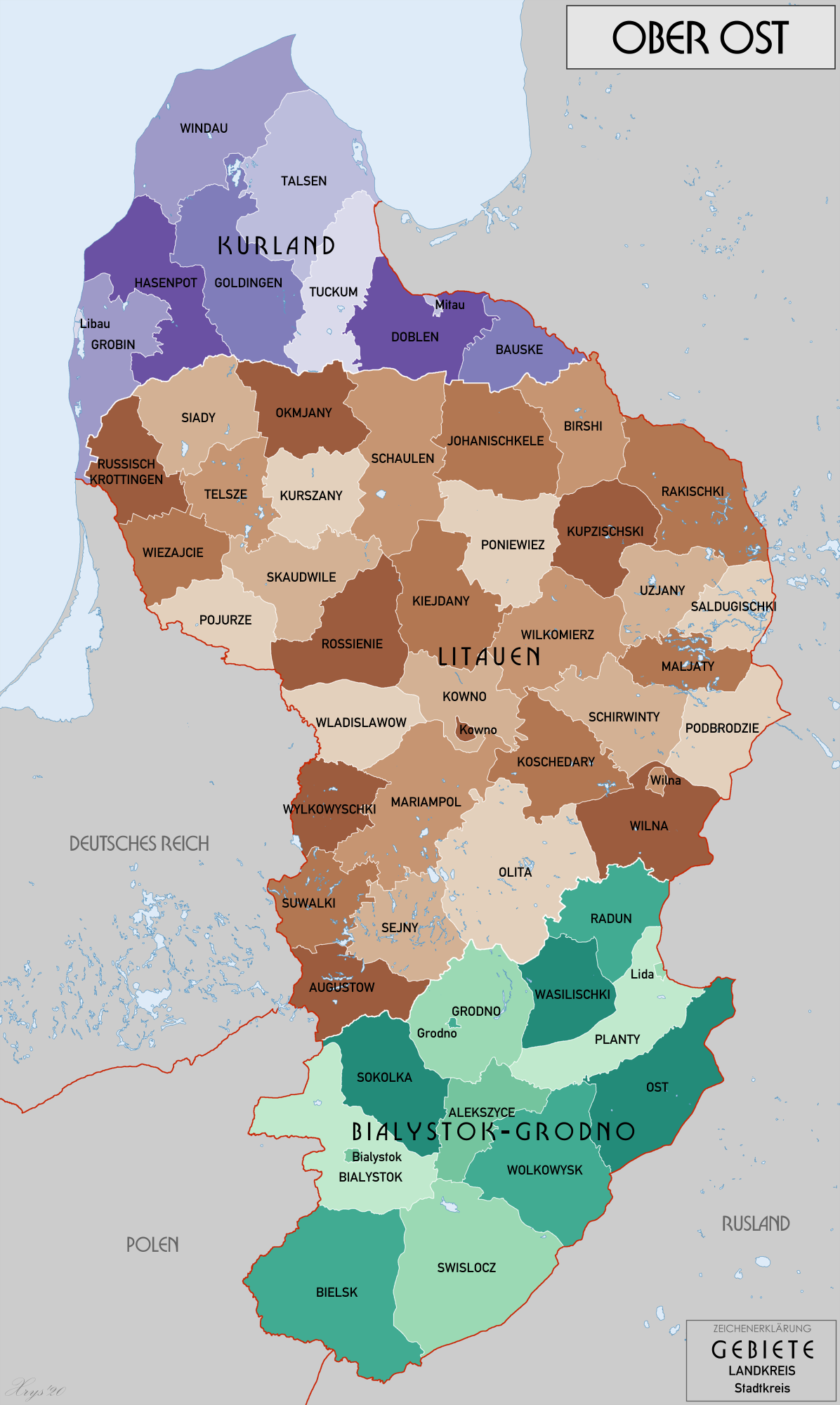
- Provinces of Ober Ost in March 1917
- Capital: Vilnius
- Area
  - Coordinates: 54°41′N 25°17′E
- History
  - Established: 1915
  - Disestablished: 1918
Preceded by	Succeeded by
Vilna Governorate; Suwałki Governorate	Kingdom of Lithuania (1918)

Lithuania District (German: Verwaltungsbezirk Litauen) was an administrative subdivision of German-controlled territory of Ober-Ost, from 1915 to 1918, during World War I. It was bordered by the Bialystok-Grodno District to the south and the Courland District to the north.

== History ==
The area was formed roughly from parts of the occupied governorates of Kovno, Vilna and Suvalki of the Russian Empire.

Initially, in 1915, the entire territory of the newly established Ober Ost administration was divided into six provinces, headed by German provincial administrators (governors), including: Franz-Joseph zu Isenburg-Birstein in northwestern Lithuania (Kovno), von Beckerath in Vilna, and Rüdiger von Haugwitz in Suvalki (the others were: Alfred von Gossler in Courland, Theodor von Heppe in Grodno, and von Bockelberg in Bialystok).

In March 1917, regional administration was reorganized, dividing the entire Ober Ost into three provinces: Courland, Lithuania, and Bialystok-Grodno.

Franz-Joseph zu Isenburg-Birstein continued to govern as the provincial administrator in Lithuania until January 1918, when he was replaced by Theodor von Heppe.

In August 1918, the Bialystok-Grodno region was also included into the Lithuanian province.

== See also ==
- Eastern Front (World War I)
- Council of Lithuania
- Kingdom of Lithuania (1918)
- Act of Independence of Lithuania

== Sources ==
- Linde, Gerd (1965). Die deutsche Politik in Litauen im Ersten Weltkrieg. Wiesbaden: Otto Harrassowitz Verlag.
- O'Connor, Kevin (2003). The History of the Baltic States. Westport: Greenwood Press.
- Rauch, Georg (1974). The Baltic States: The Years of Independence : Estonia, Latvia, Lithuania, 1917-1940. London: Hurst.
- Stone, Norman (1998) [1975]. The Eastern Front, 1914–1917. New York: Penguin Books.
- Strazhas, Abba (1993). Deutsche Ostpolitik im Ersten Weltkrieg: Der Fall Ober Ost 1915-1917. Wiesbaden: Otto Harrassowitz Verlag.
- Sukiennicki, Wiktor (1984). East Central Europe During World War I: From Foreign Domination to National Independence. Boulder: East European Monographs.

== External lists ==
- Deutsches Militärverwaltungsgebiet Ober Ost (Kurland, Litauen, Bialystok-Grodno) 1917. (in German)
