= Bialystok-Grodno District =

Administrative division of the German Empire

Bialystok-Grodno District Verwaltungbezirk Bialystok-Grodno (German)
- Military occupation authority of the German Empire
- 1915–1918
- Flag Coat of arms

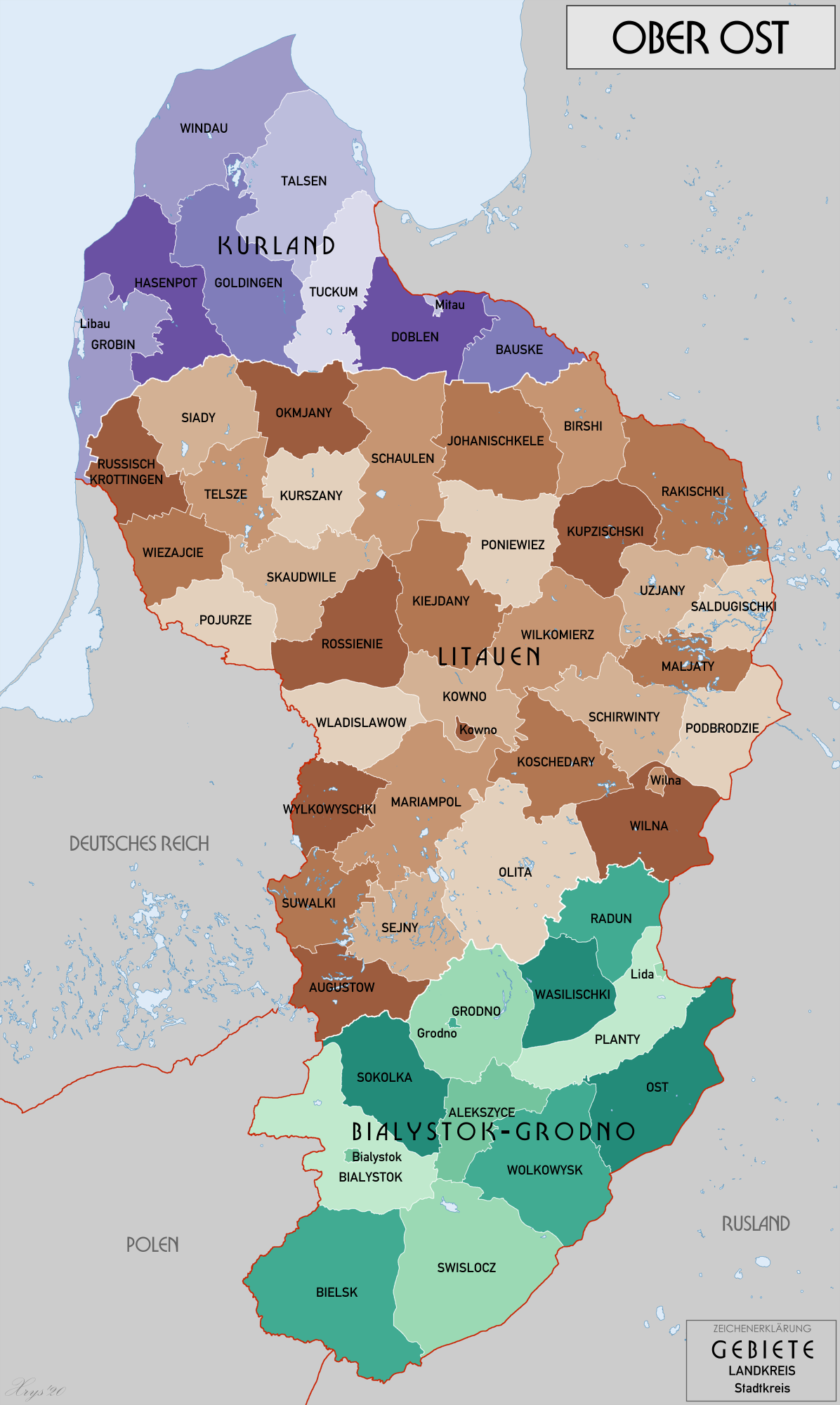
- Provinces of Ober Ost in March 1917
- Capital: Białystok
- Area
  - Coordinates: 53°08′N 23°09′E
- History
  - Established: 1915
  - Disestablished: 1918
Preceded by
Grodno Governorate
Suvalki Governorate
Succeeded by
Białystok Voivodeship (1919–1939)
Nowogródek Voivodeship (1919–1939)
Polesie Voivodeship
- Today part of: Poland; Lithuania; Belarus; Latvia

Bialystok-Grodno District (German: Verwaltungbezirk Bialystok-Grodno) was an administrative subdivision of German-controlled territory of Ober-Ost during World War I (after the Gorlice–Tarnów Offensive). It was bordered by the Lithuania District to the north.

== History ==
The area was formed roughly by parts of the occupied Grodno Governorate of the Russian Empire.

Initially, in 1915, the territory of the newly created Ober Ost administration was divided into six districts, headed by German administrators (governors), including: von Bockelberg in Bialystok and Theodor von Heppe in Grodno (the others were: Rüdiger von Haugwitz in Suvalki, von Beckerath in Vilna, Franz-Joseph zu Isenburg-Birstein in northwestern Lithuania (Kovno), and Alfred von Gossler in Courland).

In March 1917, regional administration was reorganized, dividing the entire Ober Ost into three districts: Courland, Lithuania, and the united Bialystok-Grodno district.

In August 1918, the Bialystok-Grodno district was included into the enlarged Lithuanian district.

== See also ==
- Eastern Front (World War I)
- Kingdom of Lithuania (1918)
- Government General of Warsaw
- Military General Government of Lublin
- Kingdom of Poland (1917–1918)

== Sources ==
- Linde, Gerd (1965). Die deutsche Politik in Litauen im Ersten Weltkrieg. Wiesbaden: Otto Harrassowitz Verlag.
- O'Connor, Kevin (2003). The History of the Baltic States. Westport: Greenwood Press.
- Rauch, Georg (1974). The Baltic States: The Years of Independence : Estonia, Latvia, Lithuania, 1917-1940. London: Hurst.
- Stone, Norman (1998) [1975]. The Eastern Front, 1914–1917. New York: Penguin Books.
- Strazhas, Abba (1993). Deutsche Ostpolitik im Ersten Weltkrieg: Der Fall Ober Ost 1915-1917. Wiesbaden: Otto Harrassowitz Verlag.
- Sukiennicki, Wiktor (1984). East Central Europe During World War I: From Foreign Domination to National Independence. Boulder: East European Monographs.

== External lists ==
- Deutsches Militärverwaltungsgebiet Ober Ost (Kurland, Litauen, Bialystok-Grodno) 1917. (in German)
