= United Baltic Duchy =

Proposed German Empire client state, 1918

Coordinates: 56°56′56″N 24°06′23″E

United Baltic Duchy Vereinigtes Baltisches Herzogtum (German)
- 1918
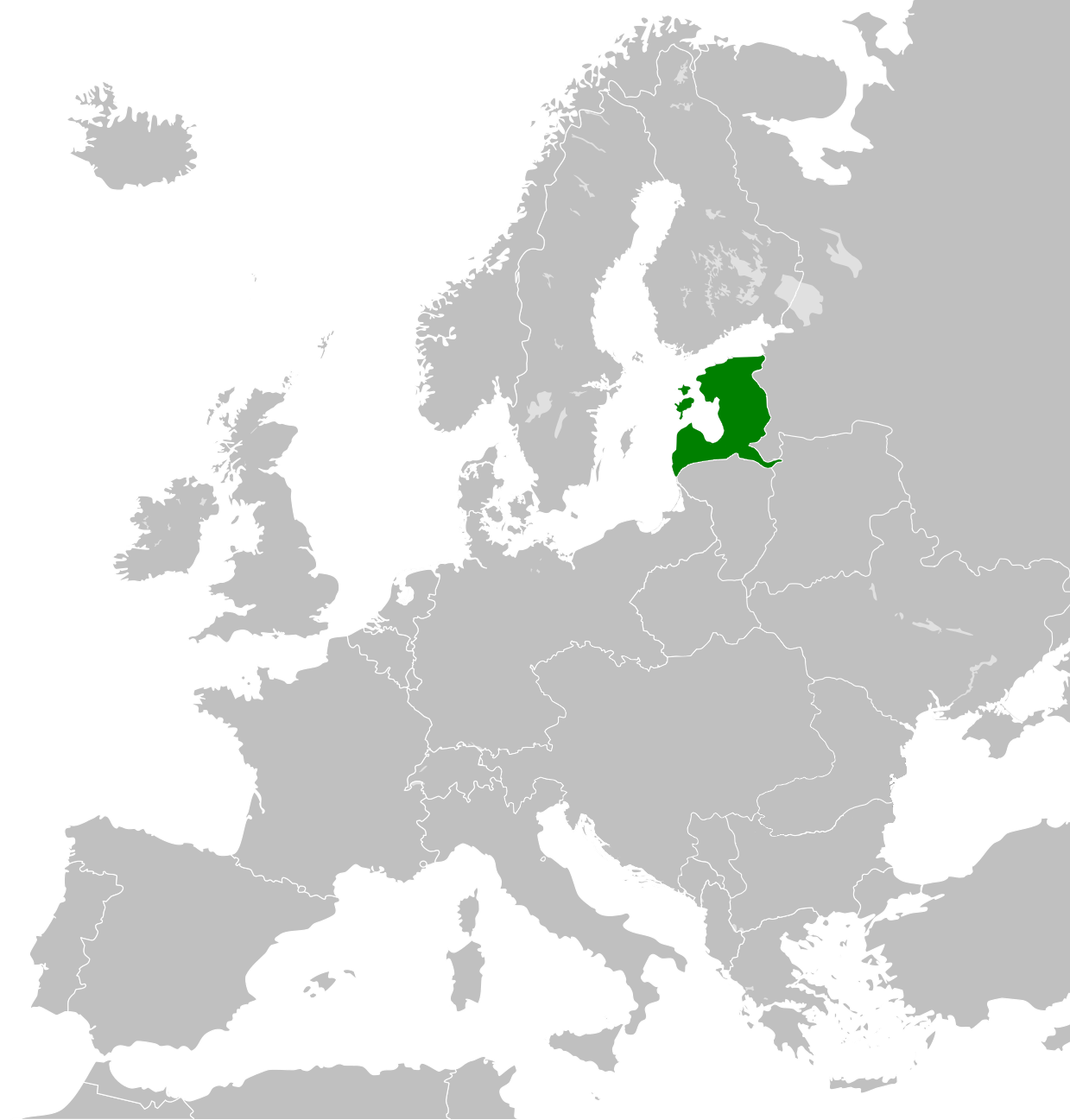
- Proposed territories for the United Baltic Duchy (November 1918)
- Status: Proposed client state of the German Empire
- Capital: Riga
- Common languages: German; Latvian; Estonian
- Demonym: Baltic German
- Government: Semi-constitutional monarchy under military occupation
- President of Regency Council
  - 1918: Adolf Pilar von Pilchau
- Historical era: World War I
  - Mitau resolutions, including Courlandian proposal for a wider Baltic state: 8 March 1918
  - Riga resolutions, including Livonian-Estonian proposal for a wider Baltic state: 12 April 1918
  - Baltic Regency Council established: 5 November 1918
  - German surrender: 11 November 1918
  - Regency Council disbanded: 28 November 1918
Preceded by	Succeeded by
Ober Ost	Estonia; Latvia

The United Baltic Duchy (German: Vereinigtes Baltisches Herzogtum) was a short-lived client state of the German Empire during the final stages of World War I, proclaimed by political leaders of local Baltic Germans in regions of Courland, Livonia and Estonia, but never fully realized. It was established on 5 November 1918 in Riga, while those regions were still under the military occupation of the Imperial German Army. The newly proclaimed state was headed by the Regency Council, presided by baron Adolf Pilar von Pilchau. The throne was offered to duke Adolf Friedrich of Mecklenburg, who remained in Germany and never took over the throne. Since Germany lost the War by 11 November, the newly created national states of Estonia and Latvia emerged in the region, and the Regency Council was abolished already on 28 November, thus marking the end of the attempted creation of a united state in the Baltics.

The failed creation of the United Baltic Duchy was preceded by similar attempts, aimed at creation of pro-German client-states in regions of Courland (since March 1918), and Livonia-Estonia (since April 1918). Initially, the re-establishment of the Duchy of Courland was proclaimed on 8 March (1918) in Mitau (modern Jelgava), by political leaders of local Baltic Germans, who also proposed the creation of a wider Baltic state, that would include Courland, Livonia and Estonia. Already on 15 March, Germany decided to recognize Courland as an independent country, and the question of possible creation of a wider Baltic state was postponed.

On 12 April 1918, the Assembly of political leaders from Livonia and Estonia (mainly Baltic Germans) was held in Riga, defining four principal goals: secession of Livonia and Estonia from Russia; creation of a state encompassing those two regions (Livonia and Estonia); possible creation of a wider Baltic state, encompassing those lands and also Courland; establishment of close political ties with Germany. The independence of Livonia-Estonia was recognized by Germany on 22 September 1918. By that time, a wider political solution, that implied unification of Livonia and Estonia with the neighboring short-lived state of Courland, prevailed among Baltic German leaders, thus leading to creation of the United Baltic Duchy on 5 November 1918.

== Background ==
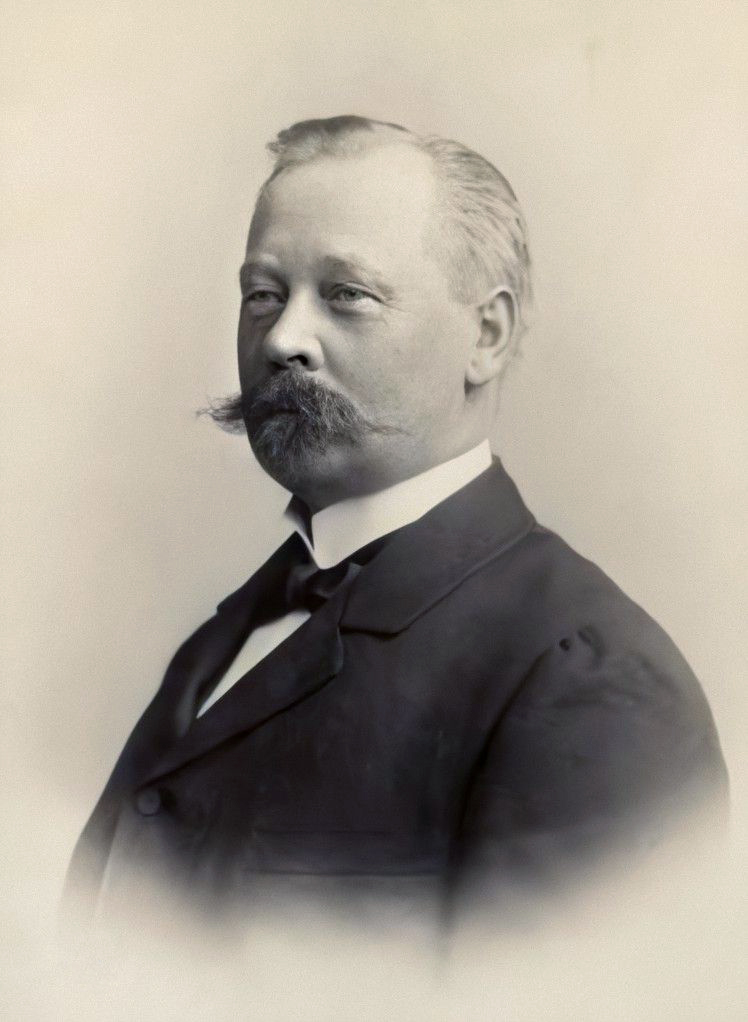
Baron Adolf Pilar von Pilchau, president of the Regency Council (November 1918)

In 1915, during the First World War, German forces captured territory of the Courland Governorate, including its capital city of Jelgava (German: Mitau), and the region was incorporated into the wider military district known as the Ober Ost. By September 1917, German armies succeeded in capturing Riga, capital city of the neighboring Governorate of Livonia, but at that time major part of the governorate remained under control of the Russian Provisional Government. In February 1918, German forces captured the rest of the Governorate of Livonia, and also the Autonomous Governorate of Estonia, thus establishing full control over those Baltic lands.

Under the German military administration, local political leaders of Baltic Germans, headed by prominent members of Baltic German nobility and other representatives of traditional Baltic knighthoods, gained further prominence within administrative structures on various regional and local levels of governance, and also established various forms of cooperation with some conservative national leaders of Latvians and Estonians in all three regions (Courland, Livonia, Estonia).

By the Treaty of Brest-Litovsk (3 March 1918), Soviet Russia accepted the loss of all lands to the west of the agreed demarcation line, thus effectively relinquishing all claims on Courland, and also accepting that regions to the east of the demarcation line (Livonia and Estonia) would remain under provisional German occupation until the conclusion of the general peace in Europe. Thus two politically and legally distinctive situations were created: political leaders of Baltic Germans in Courland felt free to regulate the future status of that land directly with Berlin, while those in Livonia and Estonia were facing additional challenges.

Taking advantage of the Brest-Litovsk Treaty, local Germans leaders of Courland met in Mitau on 8 March (1918) and proclaimed the re-establishment of the Duchy of Courland (German: Herzogtum Kurland), and also proposed the creation of a wider Baltic state, that would include Courland, Livonia and Estonia. They offered the Courlandian ducal throne to the German emperor, who officially recognized Courland as an independent country already on 15 March, thus effectively postponing the question of possible creation of a wider Baltic state.

Encouraged by German recognition of Courland, political leaders of local Baltic Germans in Livonia and Estonia initiated similar activities and introduced various plans for future status of their regions.

== Livonia and Estonia ==
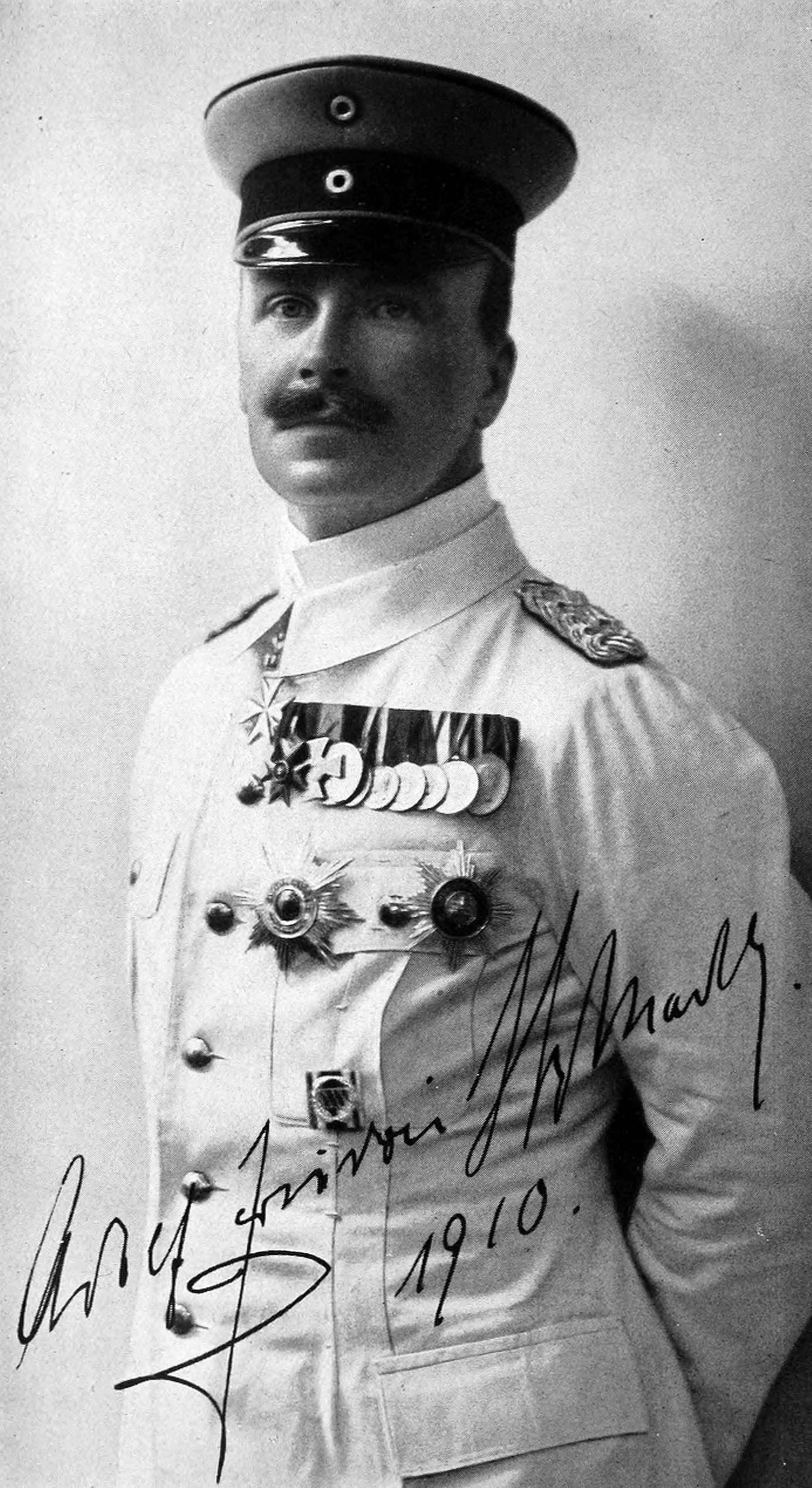
Duke Adolf Friedrich of Mecklenburg, the proclaimed monarch of the United Baltic Duchy, who never assumed the office (photo from 1910)

After the Russian Revolution in March 1917, the Russian Provisional Government granted limited autonomy to the Governorate of Estonia and on 12 April [O.S. 30 March] 1917 incorporated northern (ethnically Estonian) portion of the Governorate of Livonia into the Estonian autonomous governorate. After the Bolshevik Revolution in November 1917, the elected Estonian Provincial Assembly declared itself the sovereign power in Estonia on 28 November 1917. On 24 February 1918, a day before the arrival of German troops, the Estonian Salvation Committee of the Provincial Assembly issued the Estonian Declaration of Independence.

In the same time, the Latvian Provisional National Council was created on 29 November 1917 in Valka, proclaiming the autonomy and unification of Latvian lands, within ethnographic boundaries.

In early 1918, German troops started advancing from Courland, and by the end of February 1918 captured entire Livonia and Estonia, adding those regions the zone of German occupation (Ober Ost). Following the example of Courland, leaders of Baltic Germans in Livonia and Estonia initiated the creation of a new state in their regions. One of several initiatives that were proposed at that time advocated for creation of the 'Grand Duchy of Livonia', a term reminiscent of the historical Duchy of Livonia, that existed in those regions during the 16th and 17th centuries, thus providing a base for historical justification of modern political plans and aspirations.

On 12 April 1918, political representatives of Baltic Germans in Livonia and Estonia met in Riga, together with some conservative Latvian and Estonian leaders, and created the "United Assembly of Livonia, Estonia, Riga and Ösel" (German: Vereinigte Landesrat von Livland, Estland, Riga und Ösel), composed of 35 Baltic Germans, 13 Estonians, and 11 Latvians. By a majority of votes, they proclaimed the creation of a state (Baltic Duchy), encompassing those two lands (Livonia and Estonia), thus initiating negotiations with Berlin in hope of achieving support and recognition similar to that already given to Courland.

In order to achieve personal union with Germany, the Assembly proposed the German emperor accept the throne and crown of the newly proclaimed state, offering him the title: "Grand Duke of Livonia".

Learning of those proclamations, Soviet Russia protested formally on 24–26 April (1918), expressing reservations and also questioning the right of local German leaders to act on behalf of all peoples of Livonia and Estonia, and particularly Latvians and Estonians. The Soviet Government also claimed that all actions regarding the statehood of those regions should be the product of mutual negotiations and further agreements between Russia and Germany.

On 13 May (1918), representatives of Baltic Germans from Livonia and Estonia met in Berlin with Adolph Joffe, the newly appointed ambassador of Soviet Russia to Germany, and informed him of their secession from Russia, citing as basis for their action the right of self-determination.

== Russian renunciation and German recognition ==
In order to create legal grounds for further actions in the projected Baltic Duchy (Livonia and Estonia), Germany used further negotiations with Soviet Russia to gain favorable concessions. By the Treaty of Berlin (27 August 1918), Soviet Russia officially renounced all sovereignty over Estonia and Livonia, as well as any interference in their internal affairs (Article 7), thus accepting new political and legal realities in those regions.

By the ratification of the Berlin Treaty, the newly created situation allowed Germany to proceed with formal recognition and implementation of final political solutions for both the initial Baltic Duchy (Livonia and Estonia) and Courland. On 22 September 1918, German Emperor issued a formal recognition of independence, addressed to the "United Assembly of Livonia, Estonia, Riga and Ösel" (German: Vereinigte Landesrat von Livland, Estland, Riga und Ösel), thus effectively recognizing the new client-state, created in Livonia and Estonia:

We, Wilhelm, by the Grace of God German Emperor, King of Prussia, etc. hereby commission Our Chancellor, Dr. Count von Hertling, since Russia, by Article VII of the German-Russian Supplementary Treaty to the Treaty of Brest concluded on August 27, 1918, renounced sovereignty over Estonia and Livonia, to declare to the United Assembly of Livonia, Estonia, Riga, and Ösel that, upon the request conveyed to us by its representative and upon the report of Our Chancellor, we recognize these territories as free and independent in the name of the German Reich. We have duly executed this commission and had it sealed with our Imperial Seal. 22. September 1918. Given in the Great Headquarters, on 22 September 1918. Wilhelm I. R. Count von Hertling. Also in German original: Wir, Wilhelm, von Gottes Gnaden Deutscher Kaiser, König von Preußen usw. beauftragen hiermit Unseren Reichskanzler Dr. Grafen von Hertling, nachdem Rußland durch Art. VII des am 27. August 1918 abgeschlossenen Deutsch-Russischen Ergänzungsvertrages zum Brester Friedensvertrag auf die Staatshoheit über Estland und Livland verzichtet hat, dem Vereinigten Landesrat von Livland, Estland, Riga und Ösel zu erklären, daß wir auf den Uns durch seinen Vertreter übermittelten Wunsch und auf den Bericht Unseres Reichskanzlers diese Gebiete im Namen des Deutschen Reichs als frei und selbständig anerkennen. Urkundlich haben wir diesen Auftrag Allerhöchst vollzogen und mit unserem Kaiserlichen Insiegel versehen lassen. 22. September 1918. Gegeben Großes Hauptquartier, den 22 September 1918. Wilhelm I. R. Graf von Hertling.

== Attempt at creation ==
By the time of German recognition (22 September), a wider political solution, that would imply unification of Livonia and Estonia with the neighboring short-lived state of Courland, started to prevail among political leaders of Baltic Germans, who saw the future state as being closely aligned with Germany. Already by the end of September, their representative Heinrich von Stryk made a discreet approach towards Duke Adolf Friedrich of Mecklenburg, as a possible candidate for the Baltic throne.

Those actions of Baltic German leaders were undertaken without formal approval from the German Government, since various officials in Berlin held different views on geopolitical future of Baltic lands. During October 1918, the newly appointed Chancellor of Germany, Prince Maximilian of Baden, proposed to have the military administration in Baltic regions replaced by civilian authorities, taking into account not only interests of Baltic Germans, but also Estonians and Latvians. The new policy was stated in a telegram from the German Foreign Office to the military administration of the Baltic: "The government of the Reich is unanimous in respect of the fundamental change in our policy towards the Baltic countries, namely that in the first instance policy is to be made with the Baltic peoples".

By 1 November, the German Government in Berlin instructed its representatives in Baltic lands that viable geopolitical solutions should be supported, in agreement with representatives of Estonians and Latvians, thus revoking political support for plans that favored German-dominated statehood in Baltic lands.

Worried by such developments, political leaders of Baltic Germans decided to convene a joint session of both regional assemblies (for Estonia-Livonia, and Courland) that met on 5 November 1918 in Riga, and proclaimed the creation of a united state, encompassing all of those regions, that became known as the United Baltic Duchy. The Baltic throne was offered to Duke Adolf Friedrich of Mecklenburg, who was in Germany, and thus a temporary Regency Council (Regentschaftsrat) was appointed, headed by Baron Adolf Pilar von Pilchau, with several other members representing all regions and communities (three Baltic Germans, three Estonians and three Latvians: Bissenecks, J. Blau, W. von Bulmerincq, A. Baron von Hahn, Edgar Höppener, Georg Jürmann, K. Krastkaln, J. Saar-Körd, Roman Tarrask). By 9 November, the provisional executive body was also elected (Landesauschuss), that consisted of 27 members. It was also decided that the armed forces (the Baltische Landeswehr) should be created, with the support of the German Imperial Army, that still controlled the entire region.

The new state, composed of three historical regions (Estonia, Livonia, Courland) was to have its capital in Riga and was to be a union of five to seven cantons: Courland (Kurland), South Livonia (Südlivland), North Livonia (Nordlivland), Saaremaa (Ösel), Estonia (Estland), and possibly Riga and Latgale (Lettgallen), the southern cantons corresponding to today's Latvia and the northern corresponding to today's Estonia.

Since Germany lost the War by 11 November, the Duke Adolf Friedrich never came to Riga in order to assume the throne. Thus, the Regency Council continued to function, but failed to gain any support among major Estonian and Latvian political parties, that were advocating full national independence. Thus on 18 November 1918, Latvia proclaimed its independence. In the same time, the last representative of the German government in the Baltic region, August Winnig, signed an agreement with representatives of the Estonian Provisional Government on handing over power in Estonian territory on 19 November. In Riga, the Regency Council of the fading United Baltic Duchy continued to function, faced with new geopolitical realities. It was dissolved on 28 November, and the German military authorities formally handed over power to the Latvian national government, headed by Kārlis Ulmanis on 7 December 1918.

The new nation states of Estonia and Latvia were established as republics.

== See also ==
- Ober Ost
- Duchy of Courland and Semigallia (1918)
- Estonian War of Independence
- Latvian War of Independence
- Kingdom of Lithuania (1918)
- Kingdom of Finland (1918)
- Kingdom of Poland (1917–1918)
- Baltic knighthoods
- Freikorps in the Baltic
- Baltische Landeswehr

== Sources ==
- Baumgart, Winfried (1966). Deutsche Ostpolitik 1918: Von Brest-Litovsk bis zum Ende des Ersten Weltkrieges. Wien: Oldenbourg.
- Hiden, John (1987). The Baltic States and Weimar Ostpolitik. Cambridge: Cambridge University Press.
- Materski, Wojciech (2020). "The Problem of the Demarcation of the Border between Estonia and Russia in 1917-1920" (PDF). Zapiski Historyczne. 85 (4): 89–110. Archived from the original on 2025-12-14.
- Michaelis, Herbert (1959). Ursachen und Folgen: Vom deutschen Zusammenbruch 1918 und 1945 bis zur staatlichen Neuordnung Deutschlands in der Gegenwart. Vol. 2. Berlin: Dokumenten-Verlag.
- O'Connor, Kevin (2003). The History of the Baltic States. Westport: Greenwood Press.
- Rauch, Georg (1974). The Baltic States: The Years of Independence: Estonia, Latvia, Lithuania, 1917-1940. London: Hurst.
- Roeder, Philip G. (2007). Where Nation-States Come From: Institutional Change in the Age of Nationalism. Princeton: Princeton University Press.
- Sukiennicki, Wiktor (1984). East Central Europe During World War I: From Foreign Domination to National Independence. Boulder: East European Monographs.
- Stone, Norman (1998) [1975]. The Eastern Front, 1914–1917. New York: Penguin Books.
