= List of prime ministers of Israel by place of birth =

This is a list of prime ministers of Israel by place of birth.

== List by country ==
1. Russian Empire
  6 (40.0%)
2. Land of Israel, pre-statehood (incl. Mandatory Palestine and Occupied Enemy Territory Administration)
  5 (33.3%)
3. Land of Israel, post-statehood
  3 (20.0%)
4. Republic of Poland
  1 (6.67%)

=== Israel (8) ===
==== Mandatory Palestine (4) ====
- Yitzhak Rabin (1922–1995) — Jerusalem, Mandatory Palestine
- Ariel Sharon (1928–2014) — Kfar Malal, Mandatory Palestine
- Ehud Barak (born 1942) — Mishmar HaSharon, Mandatory Palestine
- Ehud Olmert (born 1945) — Binyamina, Mandatory Palestine

==== State of Israel (3) ====
- Benjamin Netanyahu (born 1949) — Tel Aviv, State of Israel
- Yair Lapid (born 1963) — Tel Aviv, State of Israel
- Naftali Bennett (born 1972) — Haifa, State of Israel

==== Occupied Enemy Territory Administration (1) ====
- (Mandatory Palestine) Yigal Allon (Note: Served only as interim prime minister.) (1918–1980) — Kfar Tavor, Occupied Enemy Territory Administration

=== Russian Empire (6) ===
- David Ben-Gurion (1886–1973) — Płońsk, Kingdom of Poland, Russian Empire (present-day Poland)
- Moshe Sharett (1894–1965) — Kherson, Russian Empire (present-day Ukraine)
- Levi Eshkol (1895–1969) — Oratov, Russian Empire (present-day Ukraine)
- Golda Meir (1898–1978) — Kiev, Russian Empire (present-day Ukraine)
- Menachem Begin (1913–1992) — Brest, Russian Empire (present-day Belarus)
- (German Empire) Yitzhak Shamir (1915–2012) — Ruzhany, Białystok–Grodno District, German-occupied Russia (present-day Belarus)

=== Republic of Poland (1) ===
- Shimon Peres (1923–2016) — Wiszniewo, Republic of Poland (present-day Belarus)

== Map of birthplaces ==
Note: The country boundaries in the maps below are contemporary, meaning post-1967 (post-Six Day War) (Note: During the time of the births of Benjamin Netanyahu and Yair Lapid, the regions depicted as alternating yellow-gray stripes were external to the State of Israel. At the time of Naftali Bennett's birth, those regions were Israeli occupied territories.) for the map of Israel, and post-1991 (post-Breakup of the Soviet Union) for the map of Europe. (Note: The map of Europe reflects additional changes to country boundaries that occurred after the 1991 breakup of the Soviet Union. The map also reflects the dissolution of Czechoslovakia (1992) and the breakup of Yugoslavia (which occurred in multiple stages, the last one being the 2008 Kosovo declaration of independence). But it was the breakup of the Soviet Union that made the other boundary changes possible.)

- For the map that was in effect during the time of birth of the prime ministers born in the Land of Israel during the period of British Mandatory Palestine, see this map.
- For the map that was in effect during the time of birth of the prime ministers born in Europe pre-World War I (pre-1914), see this map
- For the map that was in effect at the time of Yitzhak Shamir's birth, during World War I, see this map
- For the map that was in effect at the time of Yigal Allon's birth, during the transitionary period after the end of Ottoman rule and before the beginning of the mandate, see this map
- For the map that was in effect at the time of Shimon Peres's birth, between World War I and World War II, see this map

Birthplaces of prime ministers of Israel born in and around the Land of Israel.	Birthplaces of prime ministers of Israel born abroad.

== See also ==
- Prime Minister of Israel
- List of prime ministers of Israel
