= Duchy of Courland and Semigallia (1918) =

1918 German client state in the Baltics

Coordinates: 56°56′54″N 24°05′09″E

Duchy of Courland and Semigallia Herzogtum Kurland und Semgallen (German) Kurzemes un Zemgales hercogiste (Latvian) Kurmō ja Zemgal härtsogvalst (Livonian)
- 1918
- Flag of the previous and future Duchy of Courland and Semigallia Coat of arms

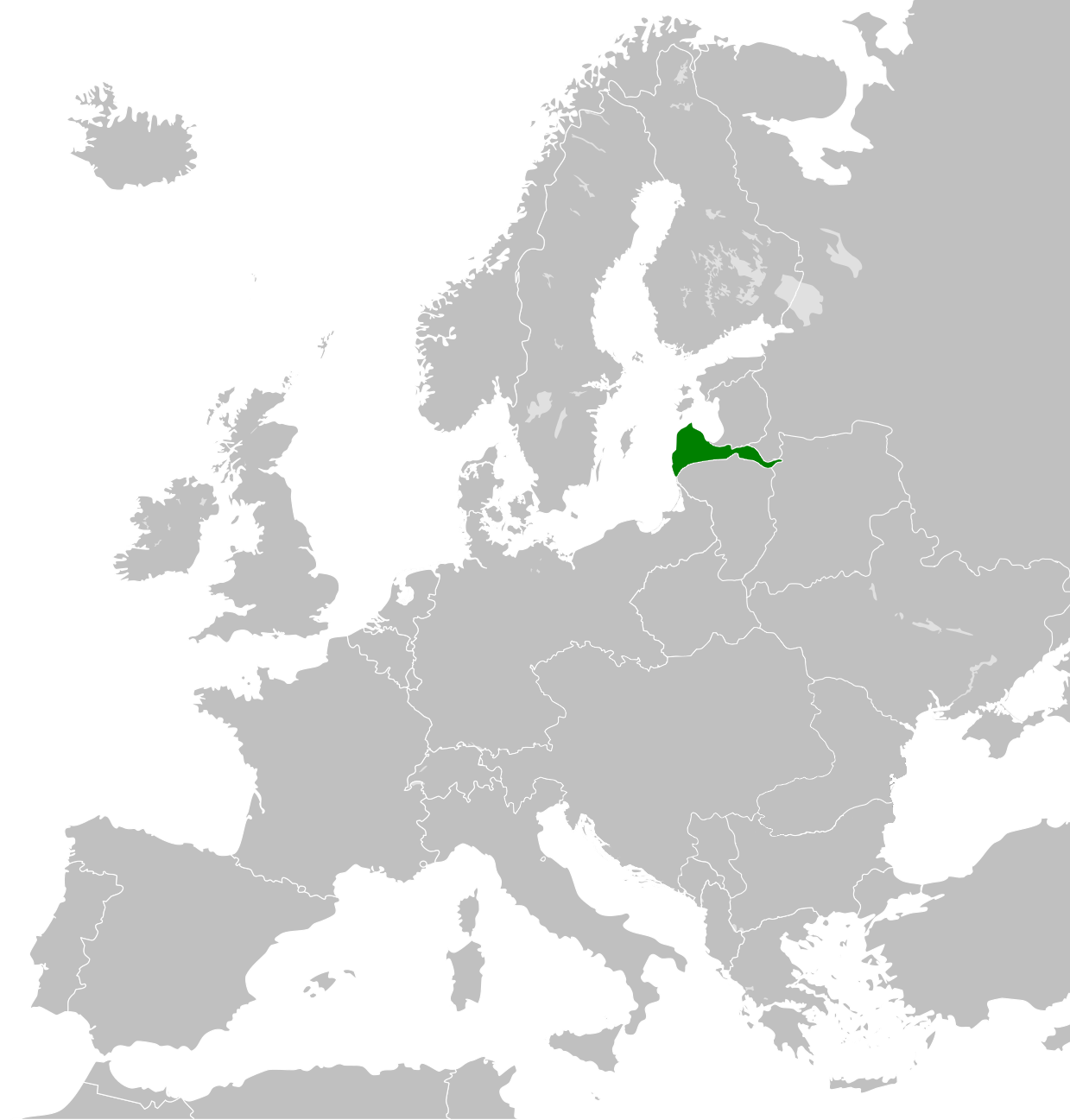
- Map of the Duchy of Courland and Semigallia in Europe in 1918
- Status: Proposed client state of the German Empire
- Capital: Jelgava (in German: Mitau)
- Common languages: German · Latvian
- Religion: Lutheranism; Roman Catholicism; Russian Orthodoxy
- Demonyms: Courlander, Couronian, Courish, Courlandish
- Government: Provisional monarchy
- Historical era: World War I
  - Treaty of Brest-Litovsk: 3 March 1918
  - Recognised by Kaiser Wilhelm: 8 March 1918
  - Baltic Union established: 5 November
  - Latvia established: 18 November 1918
- Currency: Ostmark; Ostrubel; Papiermark
Preceded by	Succeeded by
Courland Governorate; Ober Ost	Latvia; United Baltic Duchy
- 1. Also Livonian and Latgalian.

The Duchy of Courland and Semigallia (Note: German: Herzogtum Kurland und Semgallen; Latvian: Kurzemes un Zemgales hercogiste) was a proposed client state of the German Empire during World War I which did not come into existence. It was proclaimed on 8 March 1918 in Jelgava (German: Mitau), the capital city of the German-occupied Courland Governorate, by a council composed of political representatives of Baltic Germans, who offered the ducal crown to German emperor Wilhelm II, thus bypassing the old ducal House of Biron, that previously ruled over the historical Duchy of Courland and Semigallia until 1795. Although the majority in the German Reichstag supported national self-determination for the peoples of Baltic lands (modern Estonia, Latvia and Lithuania), the German High Command still favored the policy of including those lands into the German Empire by relying on the local Baltic German nobility.

On 15 March 1918, Germany recognised the creation and independence of the Duchy, but already during the spring of the same year wider political solutions were supported by Baltic German leaders from the neighboring provinces of Estonia and Livonia, who met on 12–13 April in Riga and proclaimed the creation and independence of a distinctive state in Livonia-Estonia, but also proposed a wider state that would include Courland.

By September 1918, various efforts were made in order to implement some of those plans, but already in October 1918, the Chancellor of Germany, prince Maximilian of Baden, proposed to have the German military administration over the Baltic lands (Ober Ost) replaced by civilian authorities. On 5 November, representatives of Baltic Germans and their allies, from Courland, Livonia and Estonia, met in Riga and proclaimed the United Baltic Duchy (UBD), thus finally abandoning the idea of a separate Courlandian state. The UBD project also failed, since already on 18 November 1918 the People's Council of Latvia proclaimed the creation of Latvia as an independent state that would include Courland, and on 7 December the German military handed over authority to the Latvian Provisional Government.

== Historical background ==
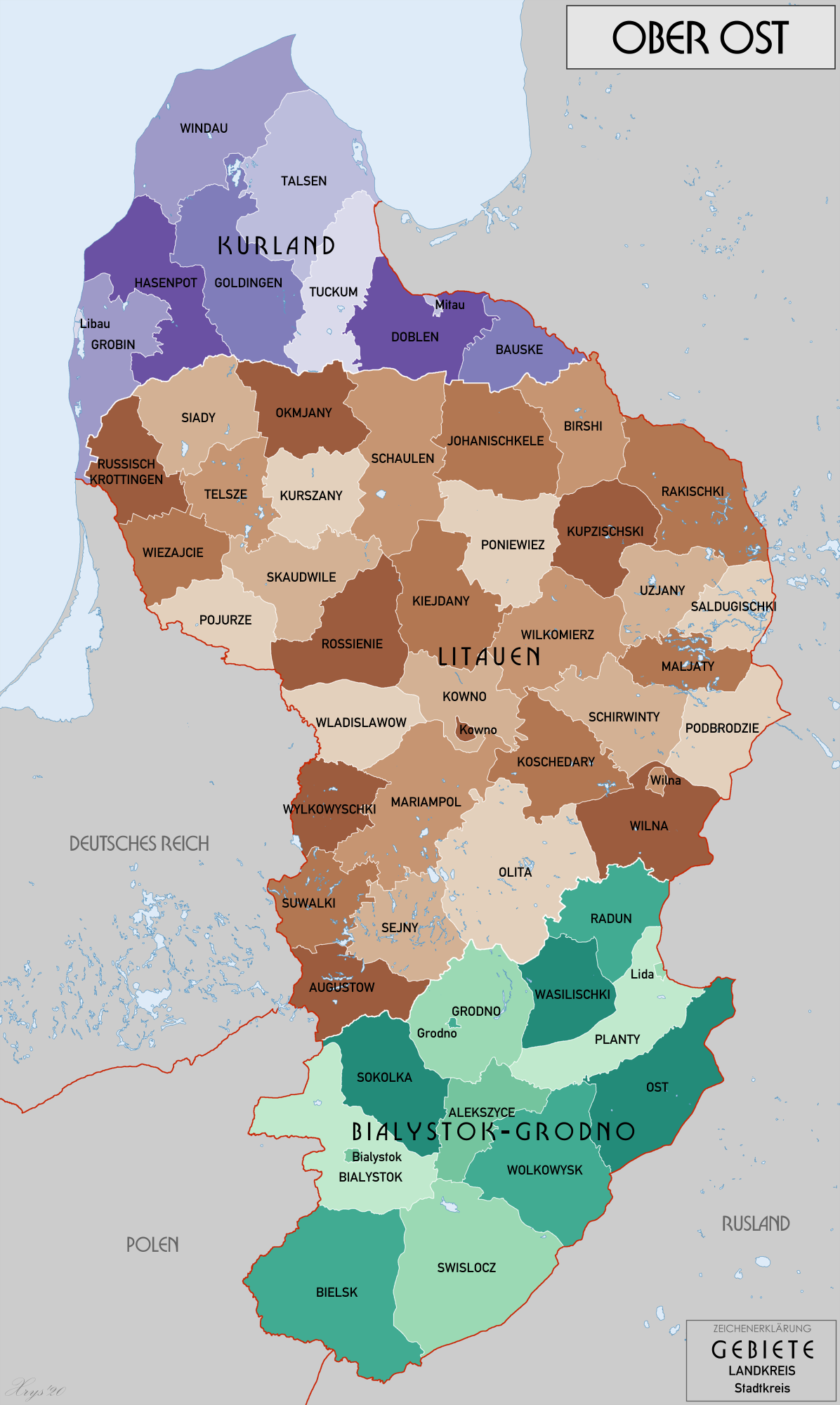
German-held parts of Courland (purple) within Ober Ost (situation in 1915–1917)

In 1795, the historical Duchy of Courland and Semigallia was annexed into the Russian Empire and organized as the Courland Governorate. In 1915, during the First World War, almost entire territory of the Governorate, including its capital city of Jelgava (German: Mitau), was occupied by German forces, that incorporated those regions into the wider militarily-administered province known as the Ober Ost.

Under the German military administration, political leaders of local Baltic Germans began a process of forming provincial councils, and also proposing plans for future forms of governance over Courland and other Baltic regions, based on close ties with Germany. By September 1917, German imperial forces also captured Riga, the capital city of the neighboring Governorate of Livonia, but a major part of that governorate remained under the control of the Russian Provisional Government. In those regions, the Latvian Provisional National Council was created on 16 November 1917, and already on 30 November, it proclaimed Latvia as an autonomous province, within the ethnographic boundaries of the Latvian people. On 15 January 1918, they proclaimed Latvia as an independent republic. Thus, two political options emerged in Livonia and Courland: one advocating for independent Latvia, and the other (led by leaders of local Baltic Germans) advocating for close political ties with Germany.

In February 1918, German forces captured the rest of the Governorate of Livonia and also the Autonomous Governorate of Estonia. By the Treaty of Brest-Litovsk (3 March 1918), Soviet Russia accepted the loss of all lands to the west of the agreed demarcation line, thus effectively accepting the loss of Courland. Taking initiative, leaders of local Germans met in Jelgava on 8 March and proclaimed the re-establishment of the Duchy of Courland, offering the ducal crown to the German emperor.

== Recognition ==
Already on 10–11 March 1918, German Chancellor's special commissioner for Eastern Questions, Count Keyserlingk, urged General Ludendorff for the acceptance of Courladian statehood, but leaders of the majority in the German Parliament expressed their reservations on 12 March, during their meeting with the chancellor. In spite of that, the Courlandian delegation, led by Baron Rahden, A. Weschneck, W. Mellville and Rev. Bernowitz, was received on 15 March by the chancellor, announcing the decision of German Emperor Wilhelm II to officially recognize the creation and independence of the Duchy of Courland.

The Emperor's recognition of Courland on 15 March 1918 was worded solemnly (in German):

Wir Wilhelm, von Gottes Gnaden Deutscher Kaiser, König von Preußen etc. beauftragen hiermit Unseren Reichskanzler, den Grafen von Hertling, dem Kurländischen Landesrat zu erklären, daß Wir auf den Uns durch seine Vertreter übermittelten Wunsch und auf den Bericht Unseres Reichskanzlers im Namen des Deutschen Reiches das Herzogtum Kurland als freies und selbständiges Staatswesen anerkennen und bereit sind, im Namen des Deutschen Reiches diejenigen Staatsverträge mit Kurland abzuschließen, die eine enge wirtschaftliche und militärische Verbindung beider Länder gewährleisten. Gleichzeitig beauftragen Wir Unseren Reichskanzler, den Abschluß dieser Verträge vorzubereiten. Urkundlich haben Wir diesen Auftrag Allerhöchst Selbst vollzogen und mit Unserem Kaiserlichen Insiegel versehen lassen.

Gegeben ................ , den 15. März 1918
Wilhelm
Graf von Hertling.

We, Wilhelm, by the grace of God German Emperor, King of Prussia, etc., herewith command Our Chancellor, Count von Hertling, to inform the Government of Courland, that, upon the wish communicated to Us by its ambassador, and upon the report of Our Chancellor, in the name of the German Empire, We recognize the Duchy of Courland as a free and independent state; in the name of the German Empire, to negotiate such treaties with Courland as will guarantee a close economic and military relationship between both lands. At the same time, we command our Chancellor to prepare for the negotiation of these treaties. Our Majesty has commanded that this order be documented and affixed with Our Imperial Seal.

Given at [unknown], the 15th of March 1918
[signed] Wilhelm
Count von Hertling.

== Aftermath ==
By the Treaty of Berlin (27 August 1918), Russia reaffirmed its earlier renunciation of all claims on Lithuania and Courland, and also additionally relinquished all claims on Livonia and Estonia.

On 22 September, Germany recognised Livonia-Estonia as an independent state, in a similar manner as previously on 15 March in the case of Courland, and in October 1918, the Chancellor of Germany Prince Maximilian of Baden proposed to have the military administration in the Baltic replaced by a civilian authority. The new policy was stated in a telegram from the German Foreign Office to the military administration of the Baltic: The government of the Reich is unanimous in respect of the fundamental change in our policy towards the Baltic lands, namely that in the first instance policy is to be made with the Baltic peoples.

The Duchy of Courland was absorbed on 5 November 1918 by the newly proclaimed United Baltic Duchy. That state, however, was not officially recognized even by the German Empire. On 18 November 1918, Latvia proclaimed its independence. On 7 December 1918, the German Military handed over authority to the Latvian national government headed by Kārlis Ulmanis.

== See also ==
- Aftermath of World War I
- Duchy of Courland and Semigallia, 1561–1795.
- Courland
- Estonia
- History of Estonia
- Latvian War of Independence
- Livonia
- Ober Ost
- Semigallia
- United Baltic Duchy
- Kingdom of Poland (1916–1918)
- Kingdom of Lithuania (1918)
- Kingdom of Finland (1918)

== Bibliography ==
- Baumgart, Winfried (1966). Deutsche Ostpolitik 1918: Von Brest-Litovsk bis zum Ende des Ersten Weltkrieges. Wien: Oldenbourg.
- Hiden, John (1987). The Baltic States and Weimar Ostpolitik. Cambridge: Cambridge University Press.
- Michaelis, Herbert (1959). Ursachen und Folgen: Vom deutschen Zusammenbruch 1918 und 1945 bis zur staatlichen Neuordnung Deutschlands in der Gegenwart. Vol. 2. Berlin: Dokumenten-Verlag.
- O'Connor, Kevin (2003). The History of the Baltic States. Westport: Greenwood Press.
- Rauch, Georg (1974). The Baltic States: The Years of Independence: Estonia, Latvia, Lithuania, 1917–1940. London: Hurst.
- Sukiennicki, Wiktor (1984). East Central Europe During World War I: From Foreign Domination to National Independence. Boulder: East European Monographs.
- Stone, Norman (1998) [1975]. The Eastern Front, 1914–1917. New York: Penguin Books.
