= Ober Ost =

Administrator of the Imperial German occupational forces on the Eastern Front of WWI

Coordinates: 52°13′59″N 21°01′12″E

Area of the Commander-in-Chief in the East Gebiet des Oberbefehlshabers Ost (German)
- 1914–1918
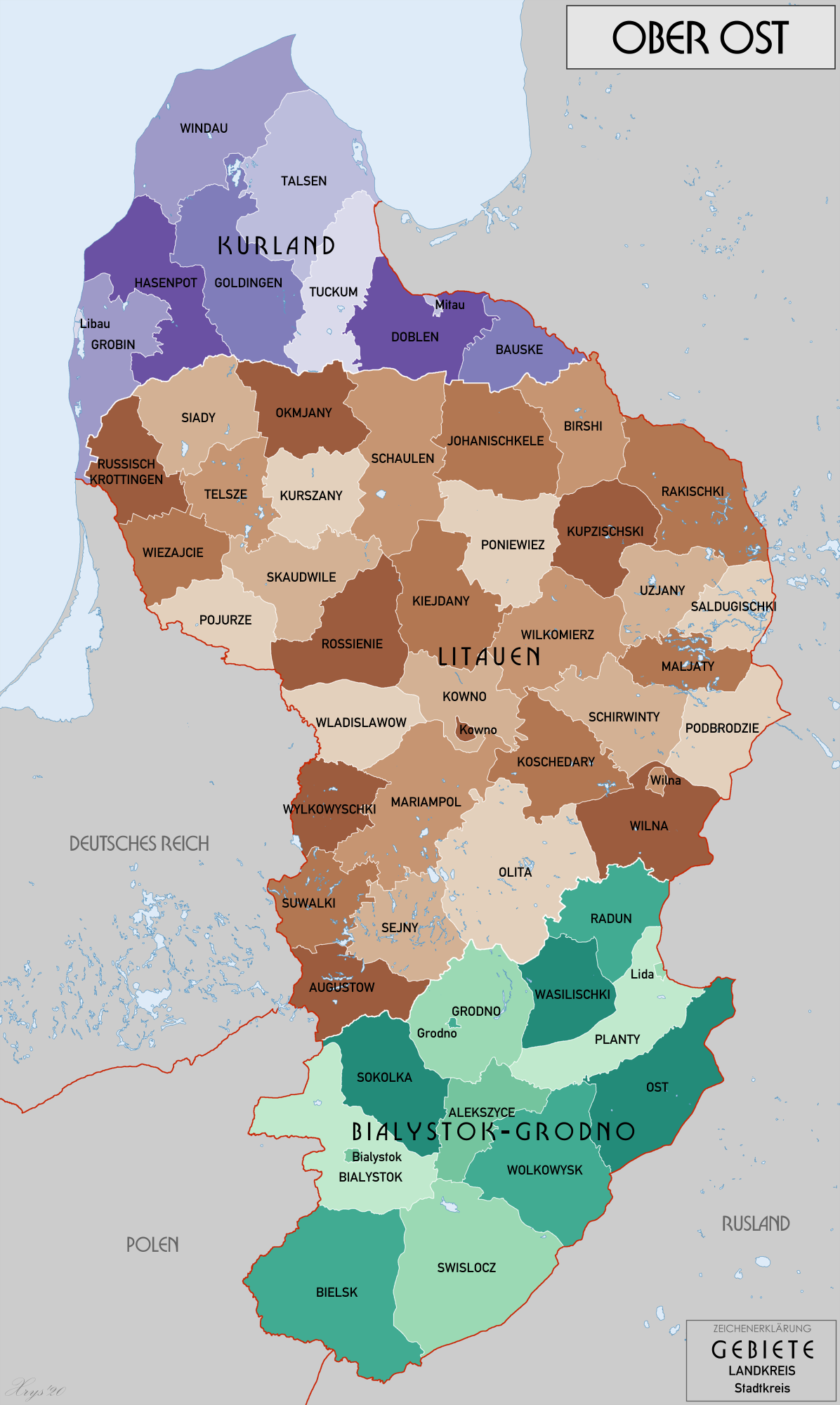
- Ober Ost (administrative scope and organisation in March 1917)
- Status: Military occupation authority of the German Empire
- Capital: Königsberg (HQ, 1919)
- Official languages: German
- Common languages: Polish, Lithuanian, Latvian, Estonian
- Supreme Commander
  - 1914–1916: Paul von Hindenburg
  - 1916–1918: Leopold of Bavaria
- Chief of Staff
  - 1914–1916: Erich Ludendorff
  - 1916–1918: Max Hoffmann
- Historical era: World War I
  - Established: 1914
  - Treaty of Brest-Litovsk: 3 March 1918
  - German surrender: 11 November 1918
  - Disestablished: 1918
- Currency: German Ostmark; German Ostrubel
Preceded by
Governorate of Livonia
Courland Governorate
Kovno Governorate
Vilna Governorate
Grodno Governorate
Suwałki Governorate
Succeeded by
Government General of Warsaw
Military General Government of Lublin
Kingdom of Poland
Ukrainian People's Republic
Kingdom of Lithuania
Duchy of Courland and Semigallia
Belarusian People's Republic
United Baltic Duchy
- Today part of: Latvia; Lithuania; Poland; Belarus

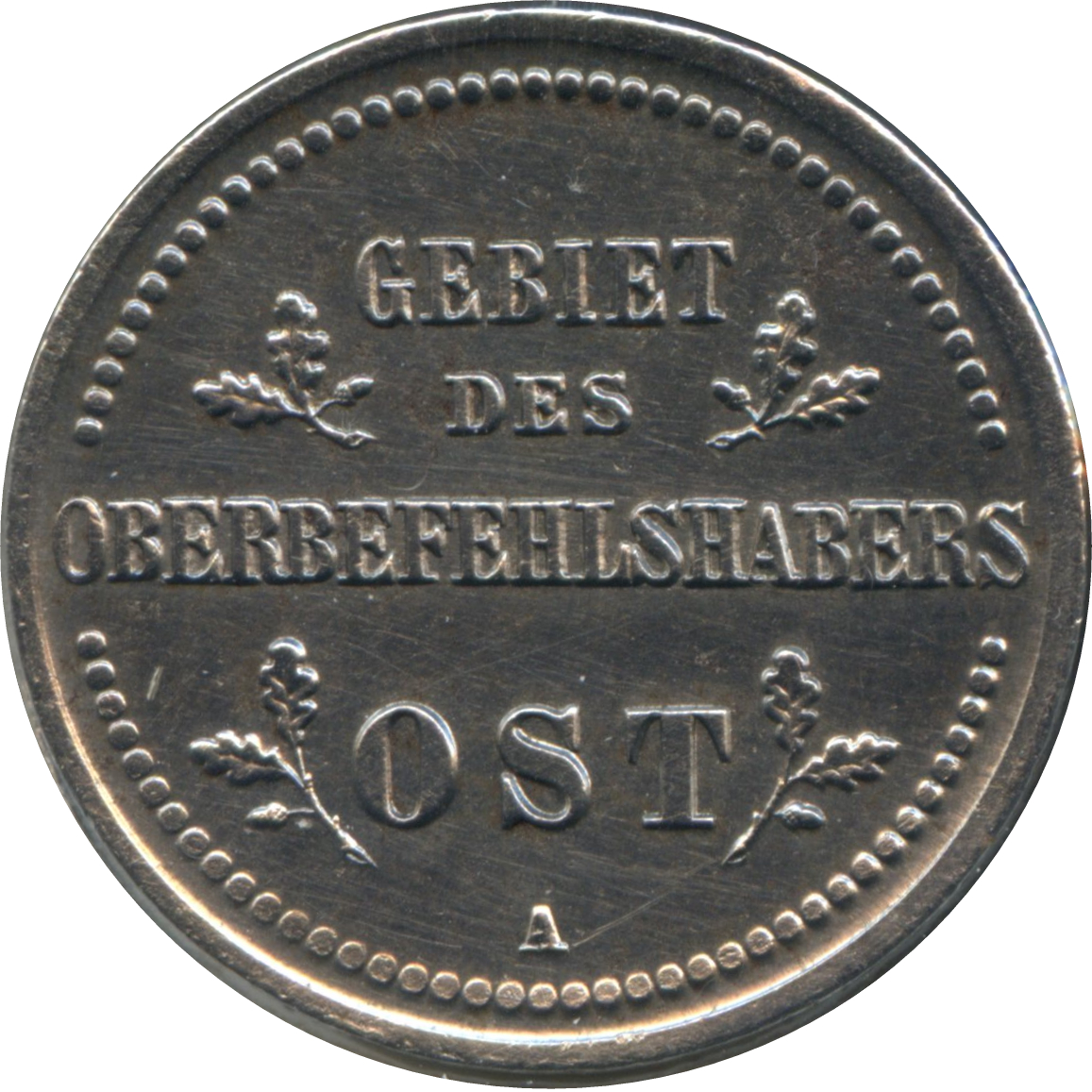
A coin (2 kopek) from Ober Ost (1916), with inscription: Gebiet des Oberbefehlshabers Ost

The Area of the Commander-in-Chief in the East (German: Gebiet des Oberbefehlshabers Ost), also known by its German abbreviation as Ober Ost, was an occupied territory encompassing German sections of the Eastern Front, during World War I (1914–1918). It was headed by the Commander-in-Chief of all German Forces in the East (German: Oberbefehlshaber der gesamten Deutschen Streitkräfte im Osten), one of the highest-ranking positions in the armed forces of the German Empire. Institutional development and territorial evolution of the Ober Ost was varying over the years, depending on political and military decisions related to governance over the occupied territories. After the creation of Government General of Warsaw in October 1915, the Ober Ost was encompassing former Russian provinces (governorates) of Courland, Grodno, Kovno, Suwałki, and Vilna. In 1917–1918, it was expanded further towards the governorates of Minsk, Livonia, Estonia, and other temporarily held regions to the east and north. It was governed in succession by field marshals Paul von Hindenburg and Leopold of Bavaria. It was abandoned after the end of World War I.

== Extension ==
Ober Ost was set up by Kaiser Wilhelm II in November 1914, initially under the command of Paul von Hindenburg, a Prussian general who had come out of retirement to achieve the German victory of the Battle of Tannenberg in August 1914 and became a national hero. When the Chief of the General Staff Erich von Falkenhayn was dismissed from office by the Kaiser in August 1916, Hindenburg took over at the General Staff, and Prince Leopold of Bavaria took control of the Ober Ost.

By October 1915, the Imperial German Army had advanced so far to the east that central Poland could be put under a civil administration. Accordingly, the German Empire established the Government General of Warsaw and the Austro-Hungarian Empire set up the Government General of Lublin. The military Ober Ost government from then on controlled only the conquered areas east and north of central Poland.

After the signing of the Treaty of Brest-Litovsk of March 1918, the Ober Ost effectively spanned present-day Lithuania, Latvia, Belarus, parts of Poland, and Courland, all of which had been part of the Russian Empire.

== Policies ==
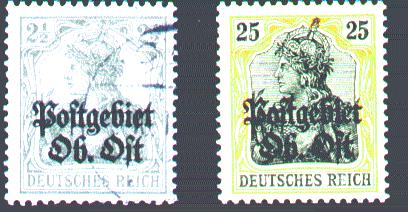
Postage stamps from Ober Ost

Ober Ost governed in a very strict and often cruel way. The movement policy (Verkehrspolitik) divided the territory without regard to the existing social structures and ethnic patterns. Movement between the districts was forbidden, which destroyed the livelihood of many merchants and prevented people from visiting relatives and friends in neighbouring districts. The Germans also tried to "civilise" the people in the Ober Ost-controlled lands, attempting to integrate German ideals and institutions with the existing cultures. They constructed railroads, but only Germans were allowed to ride them and schools were established and staffed with German instructors.

In 1915, when large territories came under Ober Ost's administration as a result of military successes on the Eastern Front, Erich Ludendorff, von Hindenburg's second-in-command, set up a system of managing the large area now under its jurisdiction. Although von Hindenburg was technically in command, Ludendorff had actual control of the administration. There were ten staff members, each with a speciality (finance, agriculture, etc.) The area was divided into the Courland District, the Lithuania District and the Bialystok-Grodno District, each overseen by a district commander. Ludendorff's plan was to make Ober Ost a colonial territory for the settlement of his troops after the war and to provide a haven for German refugees from Russia. Ludendorff quickly organised Ober Ost so that it was a self-sustaining region, growing all its own food and even exporting surpluses to Berlin. The largest resource was one that Ludendorff was unable to exploit effectively: the local population had no interest in helping obtain a German victory, as it had no say in the government and was subject to increasing requisitions and taxes.

== Communication with locals ==
There were many problems with communication with local persons within the Ober Ost. Among the upper-class locals, the soldiers could get by with French or German, and in large villages, the Jewish population would speak German or Yiddish, "which the Germans would somehow comprehend". In the rural areas and amongst peasant populations soldiers had to rely on interpreters who spoke Lithuanian, Latvian or Polish. The language problems were not helped by the thinly-stretched administrations, which would sometimes number 100 men in areas as large as Luxembourg. The clergy at times had to be relied upon to spread messages to the masses since that was an effective way of spreading a message to people who speak a different language. A young officer-administrator named Vagts related that he listened (through a translator) to a sermon by a priest who told his congregation to stay off highways after nightfall, hand in firearms and not to have anything to do with Bolshevist agents, exactly as Vagts had told him to do earlier.

Under the Ober Ost administration, various policies of Germanisation were also implemented. Thus, from 1 June 1918, mandatory classes of the German language, starting from the first grade, were introduced in all primary schools throughout the Ober Ost.

== Planned states ==
The provisional nature of the Ober Ost administration in occupied regions did not imply annexation or secession, nor did the German government formally implement such solutions until the outbreak of the Russian Revolution in March 1917. Since the Berlin Conference of Central Powers on 14 August 1917, German authorities intensified various political steps and initiatives aimed to define new geopolitical realities, based on planned client states, within German-dominated Mitteleuropa.

Such plans were already implemented in Poland, and similar efforts were intensified in Ober Ost regions after the outbreak of the Bolshevik Revolution in November 1917. Relying mainly on native Baltic German nobility and various conservative groups of other peoples in occupied regions, Germany allowed the proclamation of a Lithuanian state, and continued to pressure the newly created Soviet Russia to accept emerging political realities. By February 1918, Germany conducted a successful offensive and captured the entire Livonia and Estonia, and also large parts of Belarus and Ukraine, thus expanding Ober Ost towards the north and east.

Already on 3 March 1918, under the Treaty of Brest-Litovsk, Soviet Russia was forced to accept the loss of all regions to the west of the agreed demarcation line, thus effectively relinquishing all claims on Poland, Lithuania and Courland, and also accepted that various other regions - to the east of the demarcation line (entire Estonia and Livonia, and western parts of Belarus and Ukraine) will remain under provisional German occupation until the conclusion of the general peace in Europe.

Thus, new geopolitical realities were defined, allowing political leaders of Baltic Germans to proclaim the Duchy of Courland as an independent state on 8 March 1918, which was formally recognised by Germany on 15 March. Following that example, local German and other conservative leaders in Latvia and Estonia decided on 12 April (1918) to proclaim the independence of Livonia-Estonia. Both newly created states were fully dependent on Germany, and thus "independent" only by name, since effective power in those lands continued to be exercised through Ober Ost administration. On 22 September 1918, Germany recognised the independence of Livonia-Estonia, and on 5 November (1918) those lands were merged with Courland into the newly proclaimed United Baltic Duchy, that collapsed by 28 November of the same year, since the German government in Berlin and pro-German leaders in eastern lands were forced to accept the emergence of new and independent national states (Poland, Lithuania, Latvia, Estonia).

== Reorganisation ==
Already by the end of 1917, the question of possible separation of military and civilian administrations in the Ober Ost territories was discussed on several occasions in the highest, both military and political circles of the German Empire, but those issues were postponed for the future.

Finally, in August-September 1918, the scope of the Ober Ost's responsibilities was reduced to military affairs only, while civilian administration was detached from its formal jurisdiction and reorganised by setting up two distinctive administrations, one for the Baltic lands, and the other for Lithuania. Since both territories were still occupied by German armies, the newly created administrations were effectively set up as transitional and tasked with the implementation of new policies, formally aimed at the creation of permanent civilian administrative structures. In the northern section, German politician Alfred von Gossler was appointed governor of the Baltic lands, while his deputy was Hans Joachim von Brockhusen, a son-in-law of Field Marshal Hindenburg. Under Gossler's jurisdiction were three provincial administrators: von Zahn (in Estonia), von Both (in Livonia), Küster (in Courland), and a city administrator, Hopf (in Riga).

== Administrative divisions ==
The administrative division of Ober Ost was structured on several levels. The main administrative units were provinces, or Verwaltungsgebiete (administrative territories). Each was, like Germany proper, subdivided into Kreise (districts); Landkreise (rural districts) and Stadtkreise (urban districts). Since the jurisdiction and territorial scope of Ober Ost were evolving in time, its administrative organisation was also changing, in accordance with current military and political needs. Initially, in the autumn of 1915, the entire Ober Ost territory was divided into six provinces, each of them headed by a German provincial administrator (governor): Alfred von Gossler in Courland (Mitau), Franz-Joseph zu Isenburg-Birstein in northwestern Lithuania (Kovno), von Beckerath in Vilnius, Rüdiger von Haugwitz in Suwalki, Theodor von Heppe in Grodno, and von Bockelberg in Bialystok.

In March 1917, regional administration was reorganized, dividing Ober Ost into three provinces: Kurland, Litauen, and Bialystok-Grodno. Under that division, the following districts existed in 1917:

Bialystok-Grodno	Kurland
Alekszyce	Bauske
Bialystok, Stadtkreis	Doblen
Bialystok, Landkreis	Goldingen
Bielsk	Grobin
Grodno, Stadtkreis	Hasenpot
Grodno, Landkreis	Libau, Stadtkreis
Lida, Stadtkreis	Mitau, Landkreis
Ost	Talsen
Planty	Tuckum
Radun	Windau
Sokolka	—N/a
Swislocz	—N/a
Wasilischky	—N/a
Wolkowysk	—N/a

Litauen
Augustow	Rossienie
Birshi	Russisch-Krottingen
Johanischkele	Saldugischki
Kiejdany	Schaulen
Koschedary	Schirwinty
Kowno, Stadtkreis	Sejny
Kowno, Landkreis	Siady
Kupzischki	Skaudwile
Kurszany	Suwalki
Maljaty	Telsze
Mariampol	Uzjany
Okmjany	Wiezajcie
Olita	Wilkomierz
Podbrodzie	Wilna, Stadtkreis
Pojurze	Wilna, Landkreis
Poniewiez	Wladislawow
Rakischki	Wylkowyschki

The total area was 108,808 km^{2} (42,011 sq mi), containing a population of 2,909,935 (by the end of 1916).

== Aftermath ==
With the end of the war and collapse of the empire, the Germans started to withdraw, sometimes in a piecemeal and disorganised way, from Ober Ost around late 1918 and early 1919. In the vacuum left by their retreat, conflicts arose as various former occupied nations declared independence, clashing with the various factions of the Russian Revolution and subsequent Civil War, and with each other. For details, see:

- Soviet westward offensive of 1918–1919, part of the Polish–Soviet War (the largest of the resulting conflicts);
- Ukrainian–Soviet War and Polish–Ukrainian War;
- Estonian War of Independence;
- Latvian War of Independence;
- Lithuanian Wars of Independence.

By 1919, the remaining military units in the region were:

- the 10th Army (10. Armee or Armeeoberkommando 10), Commanding Officer Erich von Falkenhayn, Grodno;
- the Army Group Mackensen (Heeresgruppe Kiew).

== Parallels with Nazi German policy ==
The Lithuanian historian Vėjas Gabrielius Liulevičius postulates in his book War Land on the Eastern Front: Culture, National Identity, and German Occupation in World War I that a line can be traced from Ober Ost's policies and assumptions to Nazi Germany's plans and attitudes towards Eastern Europe. His main argument is that "German troops developed a revulsion towards the 'East' and came to think of it as a timeless region beset by chaos, disease and barbarism", instead of what it really was, a region suffering from the ravages of warfare. He claims that the encounter with the East formed an idea of "spaces and races", which needed to be "cleared and cleansed". Although he has garnered a great deal of evidence for his thesis, including government documents, letters and diaries in German and Lithuanian, there are still problems with his work. For example, he does not say much about the reception of German policies by native populations. Also, he "makes almost no attempt to relate wartime occupation policies and practice in Ober Ost to those in Germany's colonial territories overseas".

== See also ==
- Lebensraum
- Reichskommissariat Ostland
- Germanization

== Bibliography ==
- Davies, Norman (1972). White Eagle, Red Star: The Polish–Soviet War, 1919–1920. New York: St. Martin's Press.
- Figes, Orlando (1998). A People's Tragedy: the Russian Revolution, 1891–1924. New York: Penguin Books.
- Hiden, John (1987). The Baltic States and Weimar Ostpolitik. Cambridge: Cambridge University Press.
- Janssen, Karl-Heinz (1968). "Alfred von Gossler und die deutsche Verwaltung im Baltikum 1915/1918". Historische Zeitschrift. 207 (1): 42–54.
- Materski, Wojciech (2020). "The Problem of the Demarcation of the Border between Estonia and Russia in 1917–1920" (PDF). Zapiski Historyczne. 85 (4): 89–110. Archived from the original on 14 December 2025.
- O'Connor, Kevin (2003). The History of the Baltic States. Westport: Greenwood Press.
- Rauch, Georg (1974). The Baltic States: The Years of Independence: Estonia, Latvia, Lithuania, 1917–1940. London: Hurst.
- Stone, Norman (1998) [1975]. The Eastern Front, 1914–1917. New York: Penguin Books.
- Sukiennicki, Wiktor (1984). East Central Europe During World War I: From Foreign Domination to National Independence. Boulder: East European Monographs.
