= Adolf Pilar von Pilchau =

Baltic German politician (1851–1925)

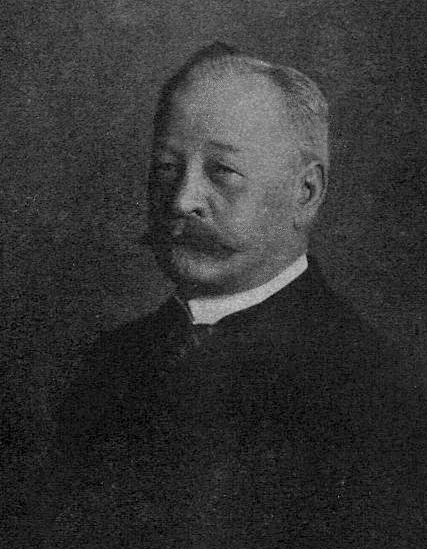

President of Regency Council of the United Baltic Duchy
- In office 5 November 1918 – 28 November 1918
- Preceded by: Office established
- Succeeded by: Office abolished

Personal details
- Born: 23 May 1851
- Died: 17 June 1925 (aged 74)

Adolf Konstantin Freiherr Pilar von Pilchau (23 May 1851 – 17 June 1925) was a Baltic German politician and regent of the United Baltic Duchy (1918).

== Early life ==
Adolf Konstantin Pilar von Pilchau was born on 23 May (11 May O.S.) 1851. He came from the German-Baltic noble family Pilar von Pilchau, who were in the service of the Swedish and Russian crowns. His parents were Fredrik Adolf Woldemar Baron Pilar von Pilchau, Lord of Audern (1814–1870), and Berta Johann Caroline von Ungern-Sternberg from the House of Grossenhof (1826–1903).

Pilar von Pilchau became the owner of the Audern manor, his birthplace, after his father's death in 1870. In 1881, he rented Sauck manor. Both are situated in modern Pärnu County, Estonia.

== Political career ==
He started his political and administrative career in 1876 as a judge in the first district of Pernau (Pärnu) and proceeded from there to the position of Pernau city councillor in 1879. Three years later, he began working for the Livonian Noble Corporation, the local government. He filled the position of the treasurer. In 1899, he was elected the land councillor of Livonia, which was a high position in the local government of Baltic Germans.

From 1908 to 1918, von Pilchau served as the land marshal of Livonia, the leader of the noble corporation. From 1912 to 1917, he was also a member of the State Council of Imperial Russia as a representative of Livonia.

He was one of the persons behind the creation of the short-lived United Baltic Duchy and the only President of its Regency Council from 5 to 28 November 1918.

On 3 January 1919, Pilar von Pilchau went into exile and lived for several years in Weimar Germany. He returned to an independent Estonia in 1923 with his wife and settled in Pärnu, where he died on 17 June 1925.
