= Nick Stone (author) =

British thriller writer (born 1966)

- Born: 31 October 1966 (age 59); Cambridge, England
- Education: Jesus College, Cambridge (BA)
- Occupation: Writer
- Writing career
- Genre: Thriller
- Notable works: The Max Mingus Trilogy: Mr Clarinet, King of Swords, Voodoo Eyes

Nick Stone (born 31 October 1966) is a British thriller writer.

== Background ==
Stone was born in Cambridge, England, on 31 October 1966. He is of half-Scottish and half-Haitian descent. His father, Norman Stone, was a well-known historian and his mother, Nicole, was a niece of the finance minister in the Haitian government of François Duvalier ("Papa Doc").

== Early life and education ==
When he was six months old, Stone was sent to Haiti to live with his grandparents, where he stayed until returning to England in 1970. He returned to Haiti during 1973–1974, in 1982 and in 1995. His grandparents owned an estate in Haiti and some of his relatives worked for the country's dictator, Duvalier. During his visit in 1982 he met Jean Bertrand Aristide, the priest who would become Haiti's first democratically elected president; he has said that he had high hopes for Aristide's term as president but that "he turned out to be Papa Doc without the jokes". He has cited his Haitian experience as being an influence on his writings and has said that until his visit in the 1990s he thought it to be an "idyllic" place. From that visit he has said:

It was an utter shock. I was expecting the place to be a shambles, but I was totally unprepared for what I found. The place looked like it had been turned upside down, kicked around and trampled into the dirt. It was barely working. 90% unemployment, rabid crime rates, packs of feral kids wherever you turned, mountains of rubbish in the roads, some of it smouldering. Everyone who could afford to lived behind high, barbed-wire topped walls. Everyone had guns, attack dogs and a drinking problem. Heavyweight paranoia trampled lightweight common sense.

He was bullied as a child due to his skin colour. This caused him to take up amateur boxing, at which he fought at welterweight and light-middleweight. His maternal grandfather had been a bareknuckle boxer based in France before World War II. He read history at Jesus College, Cambridge, graduating in 1989.

== Work ==
Stone has named some of his favourite crime writers as being James Ellroy, John Grisham, Elmore Leonard and Carl Hiaasen.

His first novel, Mr Clarinet, took shape during his visit to Haiti of 1995. In an interview with Stone it was said that the book "articulated the change in Haiti over the last 30 years".

Stone's second novel, King of Swords – a prequel to Mr Clarinet, set in Cocaine Cowboy era Miami – was published in 2007.

Stone's third novel, Voodoo Eyes, set in Miami and Cuba either side of the 2008 US Presidential Election, marks the third and final outing for the character of Max Mingus.

Nick Stone's fourth novel, The Verdict, is a legal thriller set in contemporary London. The book was a significant departure from Stone's previous novels, in both content and narrative style.

== Awards ==
Mr Clarinet won the CWA Ian Fleming Steel Dagger award in 2006 for best thriller of the year, the International Thriller Writers Award for best first novel, and the Macavity Award for best first novel, both in 2007. The French translation, Tonton Clarinette, won the ninth SNCF Prix du Polar in 2009.
