= Baltic knighthoods =

Baltic Germans organization established in 1949

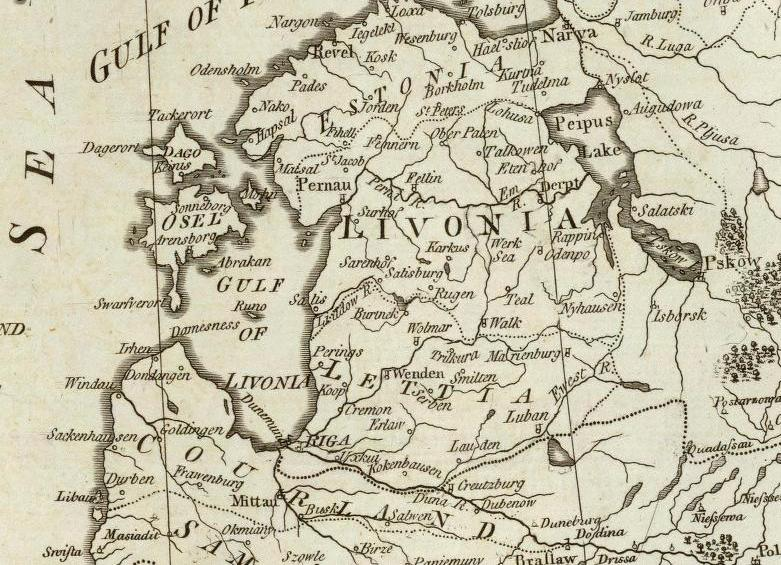
Map of 1790 showing Livonia, Estonia, Courland and Ösel

Baltic Noble Corporations of Courland, Livonia, Estonia, and Ösel (German: Oesel) were medieval fiefdoms formed by German nobles in the 13th century under vassalage to the Holy Roman Empire and Kingdom of Denmark in the area of modern Latvia and Estonia. The territories continued to have semi-autonomous status from 16th to early 20th century under Swedish and Russian rule.

The four knighthoods are united in the Verband der Baltischen Ritterschaften. e.V. ("Association of Baltic Noble Corporations")

== History ==
The German and Danish crusaders entered the area of what is now Latvia and Estonia in the beginning of the 13th century in order to Christianize the region. As a result of the Papal-sanctioned crusade, by the mid-13th century all Estonian lands were divided in the aftermath of the Catholic conquest between the Kingdom of Denmark, and three subdivisions of the Holy Roman Empire: the State of the Teutonic Order, the Bishopric of Dorpat, and the Bishopric of Ösel-Wiek.

After the conquest much of the land was divided among the German noble families originally from Westphalia and regions along the Rhine river. The towns also saw the development of a German mercantile class. The noble families constituted a minority amongst the local German-speaking population, and overall, the German-speakers constituted a small minority of the total population. During the second half of the 16th century, this area fell under the sovereignty of Poland and Sweden, which at that time dominated the Baltic Sea region. As a result, both the Catholic prince-bishops and the Teutonic Order lost all of their territories, however local self-government remained in the hands of the four aristocratic corporations of Livonia, Estonia, Courland and Ösel.

With the growth of Russian power following the defeat of Sweden in the Great Northern War (1700–1721), Livonia, Estonia (with the island of Ösel (Saaremaa)) and Courland (obtained in the second half of the 18th century from Poland) all became provinces of the Russian Empire. The Emperor of Russia recognized the four aristocratic corporations' traditional privileges – German language, Lutheran religion and self-government.

The growth of Latvian and Estonian nationalism and the collapse of the Russian Empire led to the founding in 1918 of Latvia and Estonia as independent nations. As a result, the traditional aristocratic corporations lost their legal privileges and political status, and were reduced to charitable organizations. Most of the property belonging to the Baltic Germans, including their estates, was confiscated. Many of these families emigrated, the majority to Germany but also overseas. In 1939, following the signing of the Molotov–Ribbentrop pact, the agreement between Hitler and Stalin to divide up Poland and the Baltic states, the remaining Baltic Germans were evacuated to German-occupied Poland. In 1949, the present Association of Baltic Noble Corporations e.V. was founded in which all four Baltic Noble Corporations are integrated together with the objective "to uphold the traditions of old and the knowledge of the history we share with the Baltic states, while also intensifying international awareness of the Baltic states in the Western part of the world".

== The four knighthoods ==
=== Estonian Knighthood ===
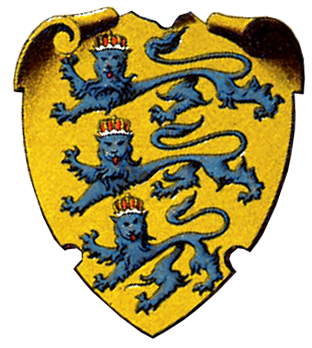
Estonian Knighthood coat of arms

The earliest written reference of the Estonian Knighthood (German: Estländische Ritterschaft) dates from 1252. Its origins date back to the time of Danish rule, when two northern Estonian provinces of Harjumaa (German: Harrien) and Virumaa (German: Wierland) were allied together. The process of the development of the corporation into a political entity was completed by the end of the Rule of the Teutonic Order in 1561, resulting in the control of the region and its peasant population, although excluding the cities.

=== Livonian Knighthood ===
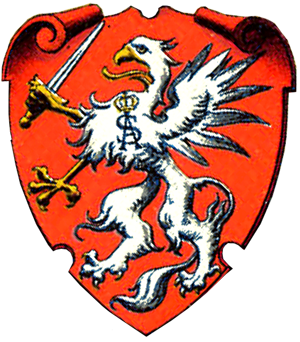
Livonian Knighthood coat of arms

The Livonian Knighthood (German: Livländische Ritterschaft) existed in Livonia (now Southern Estonia and Northern Latvia). It was formed in 1561 by Baltic German nobles and disbanded in 1917 in Estonia, and in 1920 in Latvia.

=== Oesel Knighthood ===
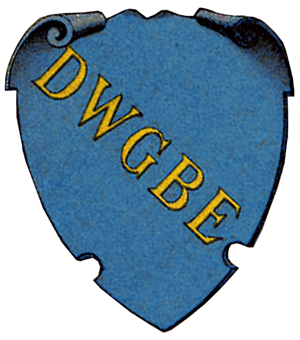
Oesel Knighthood coat of arms

The island of Ösel (Saaremaa) was conquered by crusaders between in 1227. During this period most of the island and the county of Wiek (Läänemaa) on neighboring mainland, became episcopal property, while the island of Moon (Muhu) and the eastern section of Ösel fell to the Teutonic Order. In 1238, the Seeland Convention recognized the Knighthood's right of co-govern the territory with the episcopal chapter.

The island and its noble corporation were subordinated to the Kings of Denmark from 1560 to 1645, to the Swedish Crown from 1645 to 1713, and the Russian Tsar between 1713 and 1917. In 1920 the newly independent Republic of Estonia abolished the institution of nobility and its privileges, liquidating the Oesel Knighthood and expropriating the vast majority of their estates.

=== Courland Knighthood ===
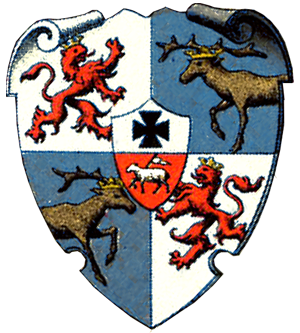
Courland Knighthood coat of arms

== See also ==
- Bishopric of Reval
- Swedish Estonia
- Kingdom of Livonia
- List of Estonian rulers
- Livonia
- Swedish Livonia
- United Baltic Duchy
