= Suwałki Governorate =

1867–1914 unit of Congress Poland

Suwałki Governorate Сувалкская губерния
- Governorate of Congress Poland
- 1867–1915
- Coat of arms

- Location in the Russian Empire
- Capital: Suwałki
- Area
  - Coordinates: 54°5′N 22°56′E
- History
  - Established: 1867
  - Disestablished: 1915
Preceded by	Succeeded by
Augustów Governorate	Bialystok-Grodno District; Lithuania District
- Today part of: Poland; Lithuania; Belarus

Suwałki Governorate (Note: Russian: Сувалкская губерния, romanized: Suvalkskaya guberbiya; Polish: Gubernia suwalska; Lithuanian: Suvalkų gubernija; Belarusian: Сувалкаўская губерня, romanized: Suvałkaŭskaja gubiernia) was an administrative-territorial unit (guberniya) of Congress Poland of the Russian Empire, which had its seat in the city of Suwałki. It covered a territory of about 12,300 square kilometres (4,700 sq mi).

== History ==
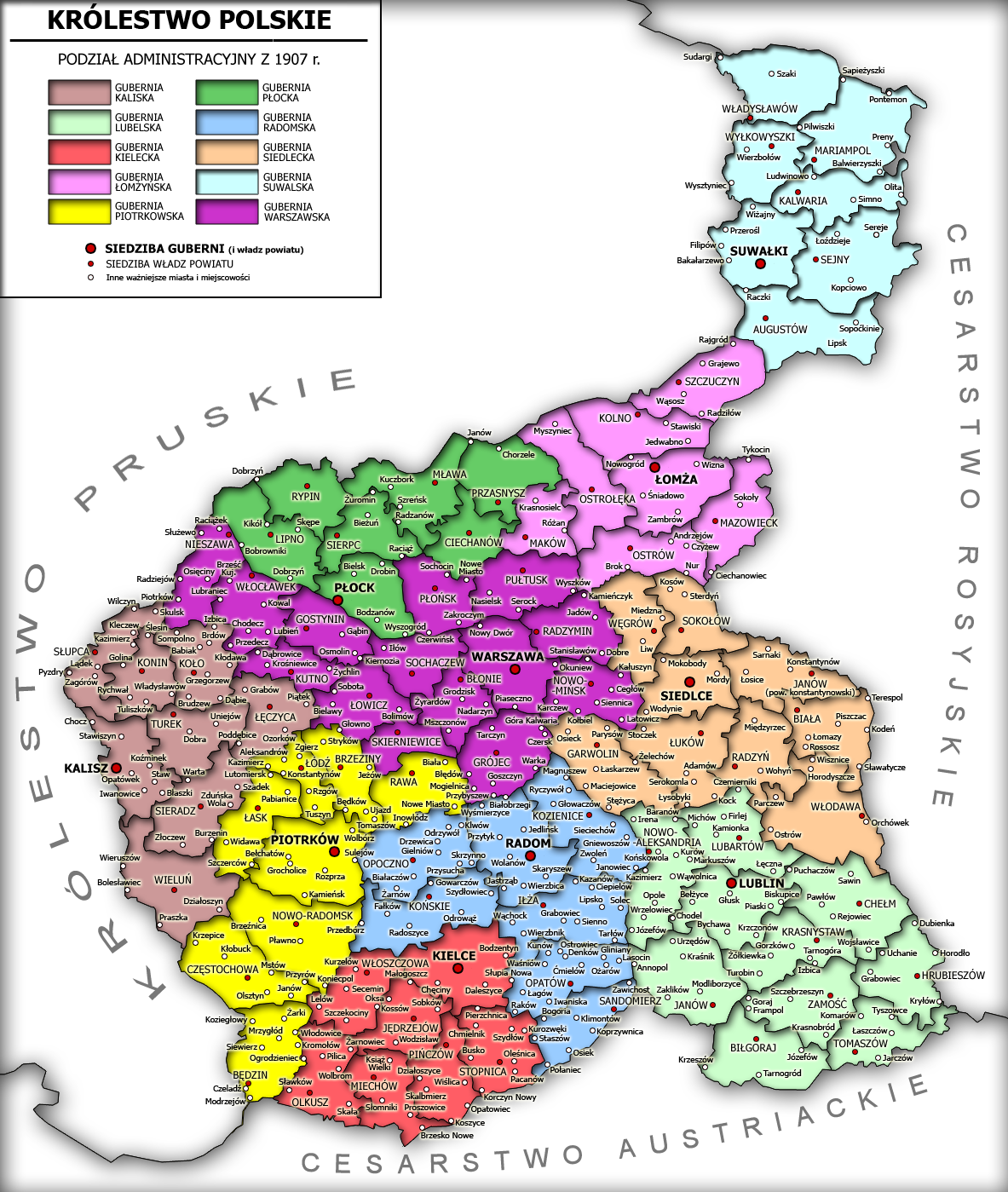
Suwałki Governorate (in light blue)

In 1867, the territories of the Augustów Governorate and the Płock Governorates were re-organised to form the Płock Governorate, the Suwałki Governorate (consisting mostly of the Augustów Governorate territories) and a recreated Łomża Governorate.

After World War I, the governorate was split between the Second Polish Republic and Lithuania, mostly along ethnic lines (with an exception of the area in the proximity of Puńsk and north of Sejny). The Polish part, known as Suwałki Region, was incorporated into the Białystok Voivodeship. The Lithuanian region of Suvalkija was named after the governorate.

== Demographics and economy ==
According to contemporary Russian Empire statistics, from 1889 the Suwałki Governorate was predominantly Lithuanian since they comprised 57.8% of the population. Lithuanians formed a majority only in the northern part of the governorate in the counties of Kalvarija, Marijampolė, Naujamiestis, Vilkaviškis as well as the eastern part of the Sejny county. Poles were in a majority in the southern part of the governorate in the counties of Suwałki, Augustów and in the western part of the Sejny county.

Before World War I, the Suwałki Governorate was economically the least developed area of Congress Poland. It was characterised by the lowest agricultural productivity and profitability. In 1912, the governorate had a population density of just 45 persons per km^{2}, compared to Congress' average of 103 persons per km^{2}.

Population in 1897
Nationality	People	Percent
Lithuanians	304,500	52%
Poles	134,000	23%
Jews	59,100	10%
Germans	30,500	5%
Belarusians	26,600	5%
Russians	24,500	4%
Others	3,700	.7%
Total	582,900	100%

== Administrative divisions ==
It was divided into seven counties:

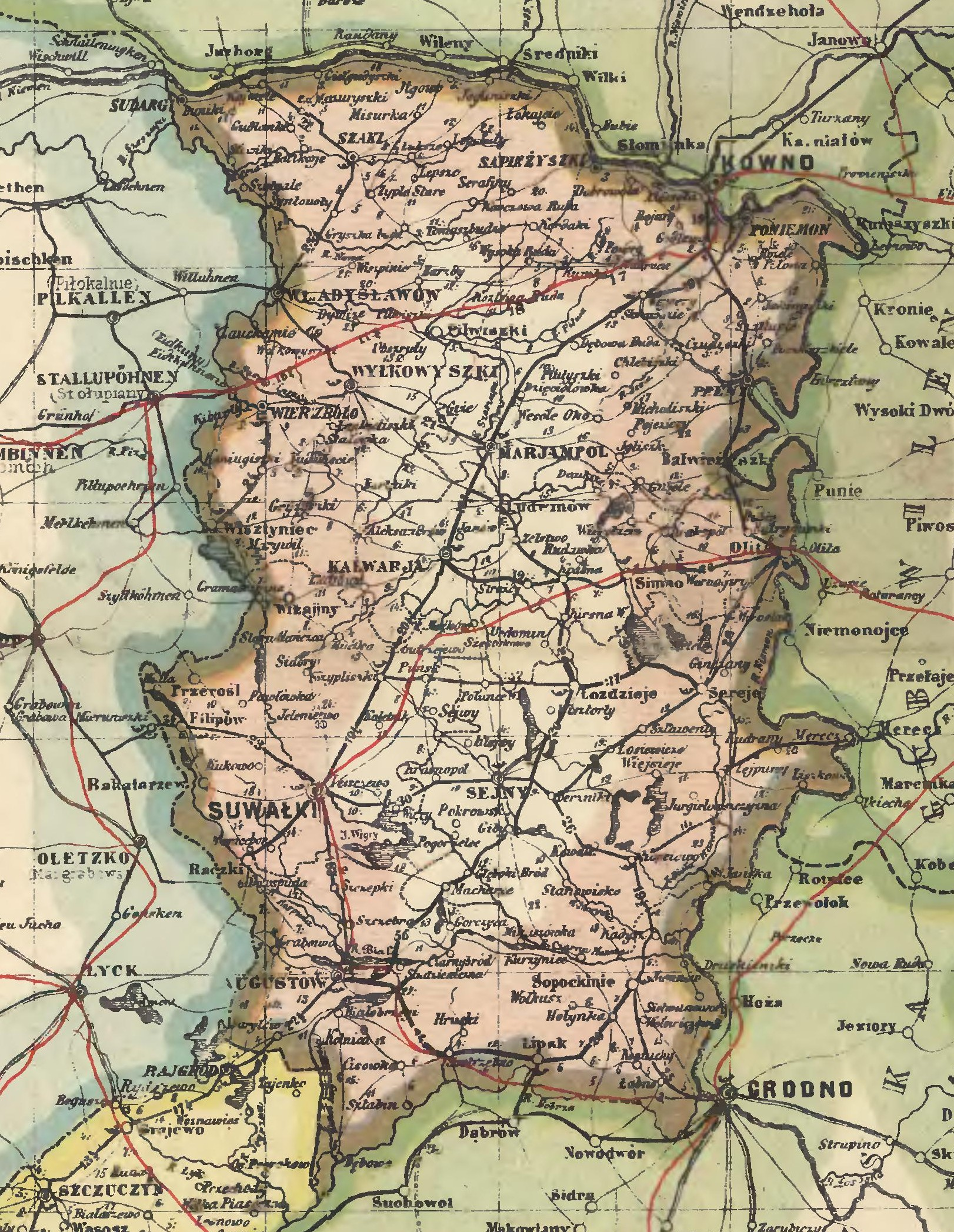
Suwalki Governorate in 1911

County	County Seat	Major Towns
Augustów County	Augustów	Lipsk • Raczki • Sopoćkinie
Kalvarija County	Kalvarija	Liudvinavas • Alytus • Simnas
Marijampolė County	Marijampolė	Balbieriškis • Pilviškės • Panemunė • Prienai • Zapyškis
Sejny County	Sejny	Kapčiamiestis • Lazdijai • Seirijai
Suwałki County	Suwałki	Bakałarzewo • Filipów • Przerośl • Wiżajny
Naujamiestis County	Naujamiestis	Sudargas • Šakiai
Vilkaviškis County	Vilkaviškis	Virbalis • Vištytis
