= Kingdom of Lithuania (1918) =

Client state of the German Empire

Coordinates: 54°41′N 25°19′E

Kingdom of Lithuania Lietuvos Karalystė (Lithuanian) Königreich Litauen (German)
- 1918
- Flag

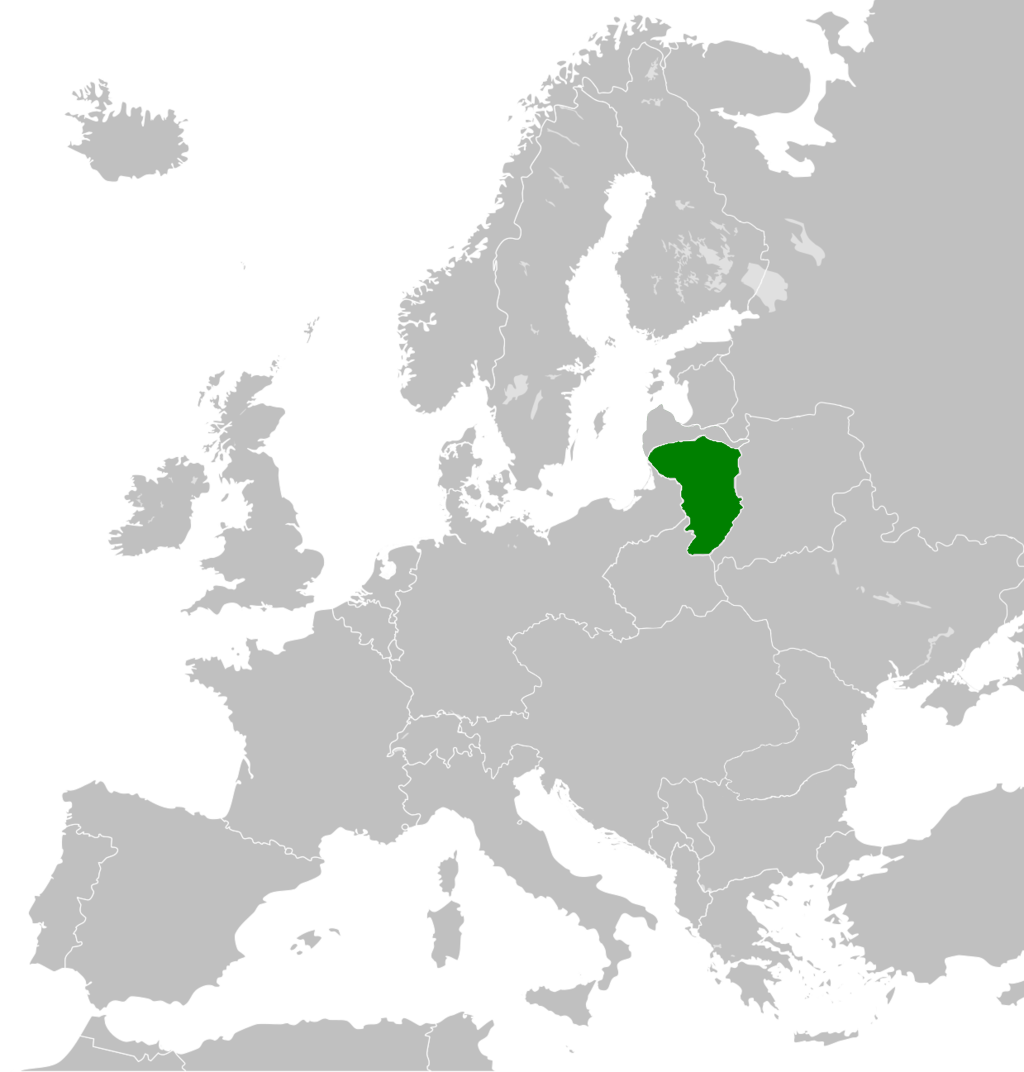
- Map of the Kingdom of Lithuania (1918)
- Status: Client state of the German Empire
- Capital: Vilnius
- Common languages: Lithuanian; Polish; Belarusian; Russian
- Demonym: Lithuanian
- Government: Unitary constitutional monarchy under a provisional government
- King-elect
  - 1918: Mindaugas II
- Legislature: Council of Lithuania
- Historical era: World War I
  - Vilnius Conference: 18 September 1917
  - Independence declared: 16 February 1918
  - Treaty of Brest-Litovsk: 3 March 1918
  - Recognized by Germany: 23 March 1918
  - Monarchy proclaimed: 4 June 1918
  - King elected: 11 July 1918
  - Monarchy suspended: 2 November 1918
  - German surrender: 11 November 1918
Preceded by
Ober Ost
Russian Republic
Succeeded by
Republic of Lithuania
Lithuanian Soviet Socialist Republic
Second Polish Republic

The Kingdom of Lithuania was an attempt to establish an independent constitutional Lithuanian monarchy in 1918. It was created towards the end of World War I, while Lithuania was still under the military occupation of the German Imperial Army. The process of establishing Lithuania as a kingdom was conducted by the provisional Council of Lithuania, that had initially declared Lithuanian independence on 16 February 1918. Due to the continued presence of German military administration (Lithuania District), the Council was unable to form a government and other state institutions. The Germans presented various proposals to attach Lithuania to the German Empire, through personal union with the King of Prussia or some of the other ruling monarchs in the German Empire. The Lithuanians resisted this idea and hoped to achieve their independence by creating a separate constitutional monarchy. Trying to act autonomously and avoid personal union with any of the ruling German monarchs, leaders of the Council decided on 4 June to offer the Lithuanian throne to the non-ruling German prince Wilhelm Karl, Duke of Urach, who accepted the offer. On 11 July, the Council elected him formally as the King of Lithuania, under the regnal name Mindaugas II, but he remained in Germany and never visited Lithuania. The election of a German prince stirred up controversy among Lithuanian political leaders, and did not achieve the desired results. Opposition to those decisions was particularly strong among various proponents of the republican form of government. As Germany was losing the war and was engulfed in the Revolution, the Council decided to suspend the previous royal election, on 2 November 1918, thereby ending the attempt to constitute Lithuania as a kingdom.

== Background ==
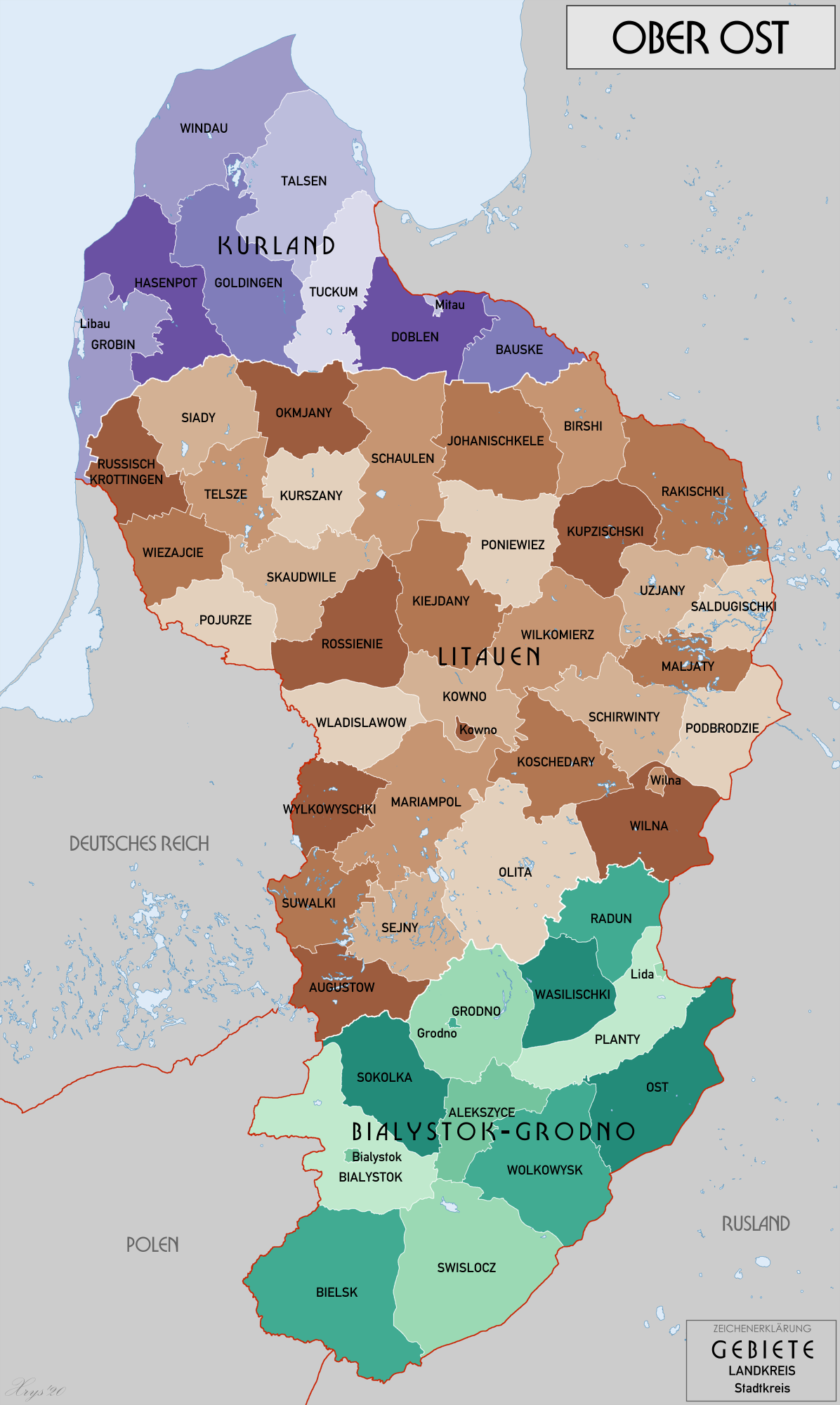
Territorial scope of the Lithuania District from March 1917 to August 1918 (one of three districts within Ober Ost)

After the last Partition of the Polish–Lithuanian Commonwealth in 1795, Lithuania was annexed by the Russian Empire. In 1915, during World War I, Germany occupied western parts of the Russian Empire, including Lithuania. After the Russian Revolution in 1917, Germany conceived the geopolitical strategy of Mitteleuropa, a regional network of puppet states that would serve as a buffer zone. The Germans allowed the organisation of the Vilnius Conference, hoping that it would proclaim that the Lithuanian nation wanted to detach itself from Russia and establish a "closer relationship" with Germany. In September 1917, the Conference elected a twenty-member Council of Lithuania and empowered it to negotiate Lithuanian independence with the Germans. The Germans were preparing for the upcoming negotiations for the Treaty of Brest-Litovsk and sought a declaration from the Lithuanians that they wanted a "firm and permanent alliance" with Germany. Such a declaration was adopted by the Council of Lithuania on 11 December 1917. However, these concessions divided the council and still did not earn recognition from Germany. Therefore, the Council adopted the Act of Independence of Lithuania on 16 February 1918. The Act omitted any mention of alliance with Germany and declared the "termination of all state ties which formerly bound this State to other nations." On 3 March, Germany and Bolshevik Russia signed the Treaty of Brest-Litovsk, which declared that the Baltic nations were in the German interest zone and that Russia renounced any claims to them. On 23 March Germany formally recognized independent Lithuania on the basis of the 11 December declaration. However, the country was still occupied by German troops, the Council still did not have any actual power and it was treated just as an advisory board by the Germans.

== Election ==
Duke Wilhelm of Urach became Mindaugas II, named after the medieval Lithuanian king Mindaugas.

=== Candidates ===
The crown of Lithuania was initially offered to Wilhelm II, German Emperor and King of Prussia, by the military command of Ober Ost. This would have created a personal union between Lithuania and Prussia. An alternative proposal called for the election of Wilhelm's youngest son, Prince Joachim. Such plans for expansion of already dominant Protestant Prussia were opposed by the Catholic ruling houses, like the Wettins of Saxony and the Wittelsbacher of Bavaria. Saxony promoted Prince Friedrich Christian, second son of King Frederick Augustus III. This proposal was a reminder of historical ties between Saxony and Lithuania: the House of Wettin had produced two rulers for the Polish–Lithuanian Commonwealth between 1697 and 1763 (and the 1791 Constitution of Poland–Lithuania elected the Heads of the House of Wettin as hereditary Sovereigns). Germans also proposed the Lithuanian crown to the Polish politician Prince Janusz Franciszek Radziwiłł, who was closely related to the Imperial family and was a member of one of the most potent families of the ancient Grand Duchy of Lithuania. A number of other candidates were also considered. Such plans were viewed by the Lithuanians as a threat to their independence. The threat became more pressing after a meeting of German officials on 19 May, where conventions governing the "firm and permanent alliance" were discussed leaving very little autonomy for the Lithuanians.

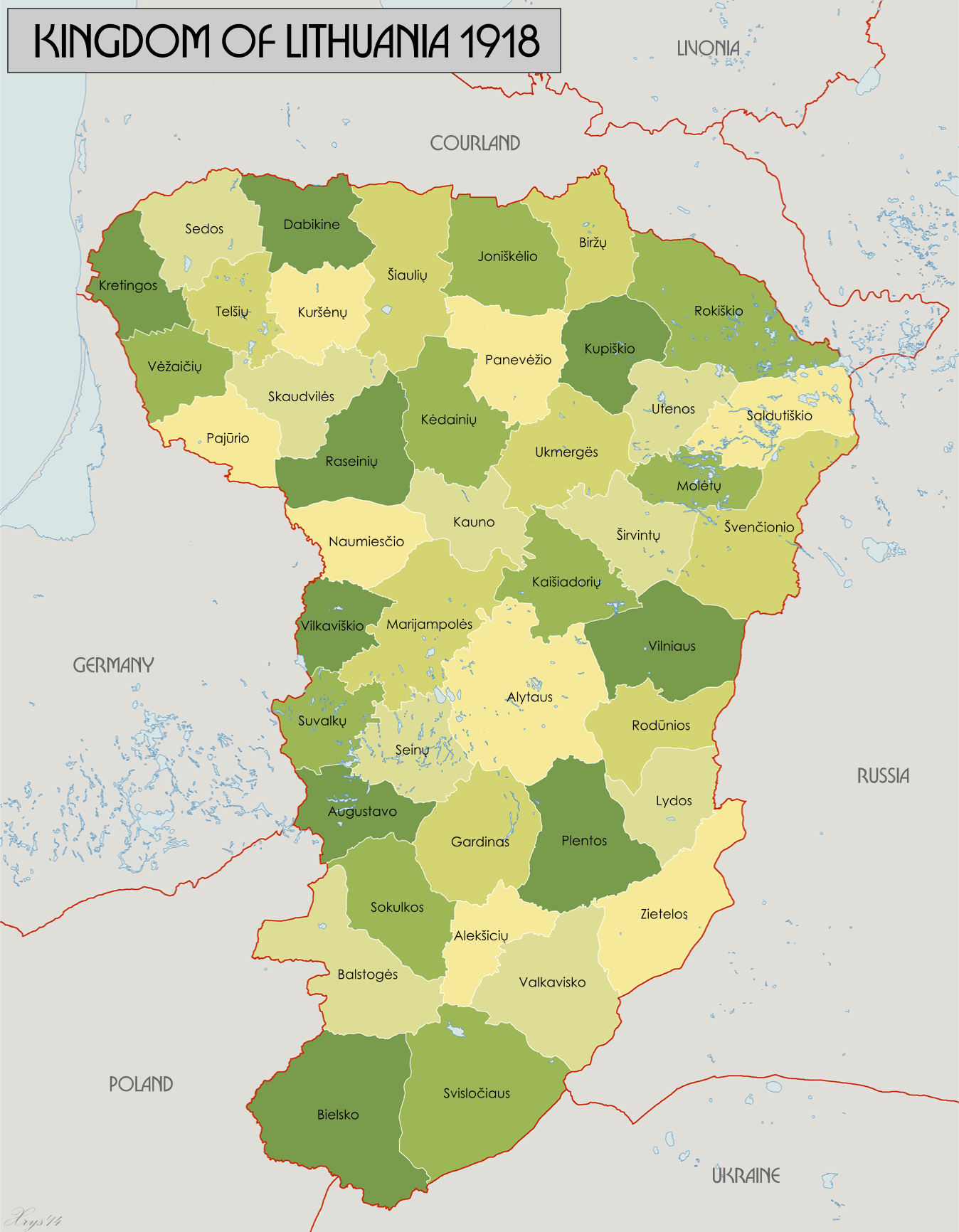
The enlarged Lithuania District from August to November 1918, projected as the Kingdom of Lithuania

An idea was advanced to create a constitutional monarchy and invite a candidate who would fight to preserve Lithuanian independence. The Presidium of the Council of Lithuania voted confidentially on 4 June 1918, to establish a hereditary monarchy and to invite Duke Wilhelm of Urach. The Duke was suggested by Matthias Erzberger, who had worked with Lithuanians in Switzerland. His candidacy had been discussed at least since March 1918. Duke Wilhelm seemed to be a perfect candidate as he was a Catholic, was not in line of succession to the Kingdom of Württemberg due to his grandfather's morganatic marriage, was not closely related to the House of Hohenzollern, and had no ties to Poland. (Note: Poland wished to resurrect the old Polish–Lithuanian Commonwealth; for example, see Międzymorze proposed by Józef Piłsudski. The Lithuanians feared that any union with Poland masked Polish imperialism and would bring back Polish political and cultural dominance. Eventually the tensions between Poland and Lithuania grew into the Polish–Lithuanian War.) Due to obstacles posed by the German military, the Lithuanian delegation to see Duke Wilhelm in Freiburg im Breisgau was delayed until 1 July. Duke Wilhelm and his oldest son (as heir apparent) accepted the offer without conditions. On 11 July (Note: The date is often incorrectly given as 13 July 1918.) the Council of Lithuania voted (13 for, 5 against, and 2 abstentions) to officially establish the monarchy. On 12 August the Council sent a formal invitation to Duke Wilhelm to become King Mindaugas II of Lithuania. (Note: King Mindaugas (reigned 1251–1263) was the only crowned King of Lithuania. The name signified historical continuity with the Grand Duchy of Lithuania. Co-opted Council member Juozas Purickis wrote to the press that "Mindaugas I created the Lithuanian state, while his descendant Mindaugas II will reestablish it." (Janužytė 2007, p. 19) Note that the lineage between both men is based on genealogical speculation.)

=== Conditions ===
Duke Wilhelm was presented with a twelve-point proposal which resembled the medieval pacta conventa. The monarch had the executive power to appoint ministers, sign legislation into law, and initiate legislation in the parliament. The ministers were to be selected from among the Lithuanians and were to ultimately report to the parliament. The King was to abide by the Constitution, protect the independence and territorial integrity of Lithuania, and preserve religious tolerance. Without parliamentary approval, he could not become ruler of another state. The Lithuanian language was to be used as the official state and court language, with a special provision to limit and eventually exclude all foreigners from the royal court. The monarch and his family were obligated to reside in Lithuania, spending no more than 2 months a year abroad. His children were to be educated and raised in Lithuania. In essence, the Lithuanians imposed "elective ethnicity." There were reports that Duke Wilhelm began learning the Lithuanian language and reading about Lithuanian history and customs, but he never visited Lithuania.

Some authors called these conditions a constitution, but that is not accurate. Lithuanian law scholar Michał Pius Römer has called it an "embryo of a constitution"; these conditions were a very basic and temporary framework that would have developed into a constitution, had not the monarchy been abolished. A project for a full constitution was later found in German archives, but it was never discussed by the Council of Lithuania and remained just a draft.

=== After the election ===
The proposal for monarchy was controversial and created a rift between right-wing and left-wing members of the Council of Lithuania. The proposal was most strongly supported by Antanas Smetona, Jurgis Šaulys, and Catholic priests. When the monarchy was approved, four members of the council resigned in protest: Steponas Kairys, Jonas Vileišis, Mykolas Biržiška, Stanisław Narutowicz (Stanislovas Narutavičius). Petras Klimas also voted against, but did not resign. At the same time the Council co-opted six new members: Martynas Yčas, Augustinas Voldemaras, Juozas Purickis, Eliziejus Draugelis, Jurgis Alekna and Stasys Šilingas. The debate over a constitutional monarchy vs. democratic republic was not a new one. Earlier, in December 1917, the council had voted 15-to-5 that a monarchy would suit Lithuania better. The proponents argued that the Lithuanians were not politically mature for a republic and that the Germans would more readily support a monarchy. The opponents maintained that the council had no legal right to determine such fundamental matters as these had been delegated to the future Constituent Assembly of Lithuania by the Vilnius Conference.

The Germans did not approve of the new king. They claimed that their recognition of independent Lithuania was based on the Act of 11 December, which provided for an alliance with Germany and therefore Lithuania did not have the right to unilaterally elect a new monarch. They also protested that the Council of Lithuania had changed its name to the State Council of Lithuania just before the approval of Mindaugas II. The Council stopped using its new name in communications with the Germans but stood by its new king. The Lithuanian press was censored and not allowed to publish any news about the new king, while the German press unanimously criticized the decision. When Lietuvos aidas, the newspaper of the council, refused to print an article denouncing the new king, the newspaper was shut down for a month. German–Lithuanian relations remained tense until October 1918. The election also further damaged the reputation of the council, already portrayed as a German puppet, among the Entente powers and the Lithuanian diaspora. Lithuanians in the west thought that Lithuania should place its hopes of independence with the Entente and not Germany. This rift further fractured and weakened the Lithuanian positions.

== Republic ==
As Germany was losing the war, the Lithuanians received more freedom of action. On 20 October 1918, Chancellor of Germany Prince Maximilian of Baden repeated recognition of independent Lithuania, promised to convert the German military administration into a civilian government, and to allow the Lithuanians to take over once they had sufficient capabilities. After receiving this news, the Council of Lithuania convened on 28 October to discuss a provisional constitution and formation of the government. As no projects or drafts had been prepared beforehand, these decisions needed to be made by the council during its session and this process took several days. The changed political situation also dictated the council's need to rescind its decision to elect Mindaugas II. Lithuania, hoping to receive recognition from the Entente, could not have the Entente's enemy as its king. Duke Wilhelm indicated that he was willing to abandon the throne. Therefore, on 2 November, the Council suspended its invitation to Duke Wilhelm leaving the final decision to the future Constituent Assembly of Lithuania. Later the same day the Council adopted the first provisional constitution, which did not declare either monarchy or republic. The constitution simply organized the government on a provisional basis until the Constituent Assembly made a final decision. Further constitutions did not reconsider a monarchy.

== See also ==
- Duchy of Courland and Semigallia (1918)
- Kingdom of Finland (1918)
- Kingdom of Lithuania
- Grand Duchy of Lithuania and Belarus
- Kingdom of Poland (1917–1918)
- Lithuanian Soviet Socialist Republic (1918–19)
- United Baltic Duchy

== Bibliography ==
- Čepėnas, Pranas (1986). Naujųjų laikų Lietuvos istorija (in Lithuanian). Vol. II. Chicago: Dr. Griniaus fondas. ISBN 5-89957-012-1.
- Eidintas, Alfonsas; Žalys, Vytautas; Senn, Alfred Erich (1999). Tuskenis, Edvardas (ed.). Lithuania in European Politics: The Years of the First Republic, 1918-1940. New York: St. Martin's Press. ISBN 0-312-22458-3.
- Janužytė, Audronė (2007). "Lietuvių istorikų politikų valstybingumo samprata (1907–1918 m.)". Istorija. Lietuvos aukštųjų mokyklų mokslo darbai (in Lithuanian). 65. ISSN 1392-0456. Archived from the original on 23 September 2015.
- Linde, Gerd (1965). Die deutsche Politik in Litauen im Ersten Weltkrieg. Wiesbaden: Otto Harrassowitz Verlag.
- Liulevicius, Vejas G. (2000). War land on the Eastern Front: culture, national identity and German occupation in World War I. Studies in the social and cultural history of modern warfare. Cambridge University Press. ISBN 978-0-521-66157-7.
- Maksimaitis, Mindaugas (2005). Lietuvos valstybės konstitucijų istorija (XX a. pirmoji pusė) (in Lithuanian). Vilnius: Justitia. ISBN 9955-616-09-1.
- Page, Stanley W. (1959). The Formation of the Baltic States. Harvard University Press. OCLC 491526167.
- Paleckis, Mindaugas (24 October 2006). "Karališkojo kraujo paieškos: Lietuva ir šimto dienų karalius" (in Lithuanian). Bernardinai.lt.
- Senn, Alfred Erich (1975) [1959]. The Emergence of Modern Lithuania. Greenwood Press. ISBN 0-8371-7780-4.
- Skirius, Juozas (2002). "Vokietija ir Lietuvos nepriklausomybė". Gimtoji istorija. Nuo 7 iki 12 klasės (in Lithuanian). Vilnius: Elektroninės leidybos namai. ISBN 9986-9216-9-4. Archived from the original on 3 March 2008.
- Sužiedėlis, Simas, ed. (1970–1978). "Council of Lithuania". Encyclopedia Lituanica. Vol. I. Boston, Massachusetts: Juozas Kapočius. LCCN 74-114275.
- Sukiennicki, Wiktor (1984). East Central Europe During World War I: From Foreign Domination to National Independence. Boulder: East European Monographs.
- Tuska, Liudas (1995). "Antanas Smetona". Lietuvos Respublikos prezidentai (in Lithuanian). Valstybinis leidybos centras. ISBN 9986-09-055-5.
- Wiszowaty, Marcin Michał. "W poszukiwaniu optymalnej formy państwa u progu niepodległości . Królestwo Finlandii i Królestwo Litwy z 1918 r." [In search of the optimal form of the state at the threshold of independence. Kingdom of Finland and the Kingdom of Lithuania of 1918]. Studia Iuridica Toruniensia.
