= Georg von Rauch (historian) =

Baltic German historian

- Born: Georg Alexander Kornelius Erich von Rauch; 1904; Pskov, Pskov Governorate, Russian Empire
- Died: 17 October 1991 (aged 87); Kiel, Schleswig-Holstein, Germany
- Board member of: Baltische Historische Kommission
- Spouse: Margarethe Reimer (m. 1938)
- Children: Georg von Rauch
- Parent: Cornelius von Rauch (father)

Academic background
- Education: Silesian Friedrich Wilhelm University in Breslau
- Thesis: Reval zur dänischen Zeit und die Hanse (1927)

Academic work
- Discipline: History
- Sub-discipline: Modern history
- Main interests: Eastern Europe
- Military service
- Allegiance: Nazi Germany
- Branch: Foreign Armies East
- Service years: 1941–1945
- Rank: Sonderführer
- Unit: Gruppe III
- Conflict: World War II

Georg von Rauch (1904–1991) was a Baltic German historian specializing in Russia and the Baltic states.

Rauch was born in Pskov, the son of Kornelius Anton Friedrich Wilhelm von Rauch, an officer in the Russian army. In 1911 the family moved to Sangaste in Governorate of Livonia. Rauch graduated from the University of Tartu with a degree in history in 1927, leaving for Germany in 1939. He joined the staff of the University of Marburg, where he taught Russian history, in 1946, becoming a professor in 1953. In 1958 he accepted an offer from the University of Kiel, where he became head of the Institute on East European History. His pioneering history of the Soviet Union was translated into other languages and became a standard textbook.

His son was the left-wing activist Georg von Rauch, killed by the police in 1971 at age 24.

== Works ==
- Geschichte des bolschewistischen Russland (Wiesbaden: Rheinische Verlags-Anstalt, 1955); tr. as A History of Soviet Russia (New York: Praeger, 1957; rev. edd. 1958, 1962, 1964, 1967, 1972).
- Die Geschichte der baltischen Staaten (München: Deutsche Taschenbuch Verlag, 1990); tr. as The Baltic States: The Years of Independence: Estonia, Latvia, Lithuania, 1917–1940 (New York: St. Martin's Press, 1995).
