= Kevin O'Connor (historian) =

Kevin C. O'Connor is an American historian and professor who is the departmental chair of history at Gonzaga University in Spokane, Washington.

== Books ==
- History of the Baltic States (Greenwood Press, 2003)
- Intellectuals and Apparatchiks: Russian Nationalism and the Gorbachev Revolution (Lexington Books, 2006)
- Culture and Customs of the Baltic States (Greenwood Press, 2006).
- The House of Hemp and Butter: A History of Old Riga (Ithaca: Northern Illinois University Press, 2019)
