= Norman Stone =

British historian and author (1941–2019)

- Stone in 2010
- Born: 8 March 1941; Kelvinside, Glasgow, Scotland
- Died: 19 June 2019 (aged 78); Budapest, Hungary
- Employer(s): University of Cambridge: Fellow, Gonville and Caius College (1965–1971); Lecturer in Russian history (1967–1984); Fellow, Jesus College (1971–79); Fellow, Trinity College (1979–1984); University of Oxford: Professor of Modern History (1984–1997); Fellow, Worcester College (1984–1997); Bilkent University, Ankara: Professor of International Relations (1997–2017)
- Title: Professor
- Political party: Conservative
- Spouses: Marie Nicole Aubry (m. 1966; div. 1977) Christine Margaret Booker (m. 1982; died 2016)
- Children: 3, including Nick

Academic background
- Education: Gonville and Caius College, Cambridge (BA)

Academic work
- Discipline: History
- Doctoral students: Orlando Figes, Niall Ferguson
- Notable students: Adair Turner, Noel Malcolm, Daniel Johnson, Jonathan Hill, Andrew Roberts, Anne Applebaum, Dominic Cummings

Norman Stone (8 March 1941 – 19 June 2019) was a British historian and author. At the time of his death, he was Professor of European History in the Department of International Relations at Bilkent University, Ankara, having formerly been a professor at the University of Oxford, a lecturer at the University of Cambridge, and an adviser to British prime minister Margaret Thatcher. He was a board member of the Center for Eurasian Studies (AVIM).

== Early life and education ==
Stone was born in Kelvinside, Glasgow, the son of Mary Robertson (née Pettigrew, died 1991), a schoolteacher, and Norman Stone, a flight lieutenant and Spitfire pilot in the Second World War who fought in the Battle of Britain. His father was killed in a training accident in 1942. The younger Norman attended the Glasgow Academy on a scholarship for the children of deceased servicemen, before winning a modern languages scholarship to study at Gonville and Caius College, Cambridge, where he graduated with first-class honours in Part II of the history tripos in 1962.

Following his undergraduate degree, Stone did research in Central European history in Vienna and Budapest (1962–65), studying archives on the Austro-Hungarian Army from the years before 1914. During this period he spent three months imprisoned in Bratislava, having been caught trying to smuggle a Hungarian dissident in his car boot across the Iron Curtain at the Czech–Austrian border.

== Career ==
=== Cambridge ===
Stone did not complete his doctorate, having been offered a research fellowship by Gonville and Caius College, where he later became an assistant lecturer in Russian and German History (1967), and a full lecturer (1973). In 1971, he transferred from Caius to Jesus College. While Stone was well regarded as a teacher, over time he increasingly neglected his duties.

=== Oxford ===
Stone was appointed in 1984 as Professor of Modern History at Oxford University, England. Stone's tenure at Oxford was not without controversy. Petronella Wyatt wrote that Stone "loathed the place as petty and provincial, and for its adherence to the Marxist-determinist view of history." During his period at Oxford Stone gained a reputation for groping female students.

Stone published a column in The Sunday Times between 1987 and 1992, and was also employed by the BBC, the Frankfurter Allgemeine Zeitung, and The Wall Street Journal. Stone became Margaret Thatcher's foreign policy advisor on Europe, as well as her speechwriter.

In May 1994 Stone gave a half-hour Opinions lecture televised on Channel 4 and subsequently published in The Independent. That newspaper later reviewed the lecture as "Little England has never had such great lines: there were the Germans (They want to be good Europeans because it stops them being bad Germans), and the Scandinavians (They only unite around the principle of finding the goody-goody Swedes very irritating)... But as he led us through the corridors of EC lunacy, you saw the point: only through a Lewis Carroll mirror could you meet such grotesques as the Gatt kings: Not so long ago a cow cost more than a student. Nowadays, a non-cow costs even more ... On 1 September 1939, the League (of Nations) ignored Hitler's invasion of Poland because it was embarrassing, it moved instead to discuss the standardisation of level-crossings."

=== Turkey ===
In 1997, Stone retired from his chair at Oxford and left to teach at the department of International Relations at Bilkent University, Ankara. As an example of Stone's wit and acute understanding, Niall Ferguson shares in his obituary paper the answer Stone gave when asked why he had moved: "in the depth of my being, I'm a Scotsman and feel entirely at home in an enlightenment that has failed".

In 2005 Stone transferred to Koç University, Istanbul. He later returned to Bilkent University to teach for the 2007–2008 academic year. He guest lectured at Boğaziçi University, Istanbul. After moving to Turkey, Stone became a frequent contributor to Cornucopia, a magazine about the history and culture of Turkey. In 2010, Stone published a book on Turkish history, from the 11th century to the present day, Turkey: A Short History.

=== Views ===
Stone received some criticism for an obituary he wrote in 1983 for the London Review of Books of E. H. Carr, denouncing Carr's support of the Soviet Union, which some felt bordered on the defamatory. Lawrence Goldman notes however that "Stone's critique of an unreadable multi-volume chronicle of Soviet policy based only on official sources was undoubtedly correct, and foreshadowed the collapse of the Soviet Union itself."

In 1990 Stone was one of the historians behind the setting up of the History Curriculum Association. The Association advocated a more knowledge-based history curriculum in schools. It expressed "profound disquiet" at the way history was being taught in the classroom and claimed that the integrity of history was threatened.

Stone questioned the use of the word genocide in connection with the deaths of approximately 1.5 million Armenians in the Ottoman Empire during the First World War, arousing significant controversy. In 2004, he took part in a notable letter exchange on the pages of The Times Literary Supplement, where he strongly criticized Peter Balakian's 2003 book The Burning Tigris, saying that Balakian "should stick to the poems". Stone praised Guenter Lewy, Bernard Lewis and France-based scholar Gilles Veinstein, all of whom do not believe a genocide took place.

In 2009, he argued: "The myth of Winston Churchill is dangerous. Was it a sensible strategy in 1944 and 1945 to bomb Germany to bits? It was very bad realpolitik, whatever its moral purpose." In his biography of Hitler, Stone critiqued Mein Kampf as "long-winded, self-important, and written in an extraordinarily opaque jargon, though not much more so than other works of sociology".

Stone described John Keegan's The Second World War as his preferred book on the subject, saying: "There have been many and varied, and sometimes splendid, books on the Second World War, but my own preference is John Keegan's The Second World War (1990)".

=== Writing ===
For The Eastern Front 1914–1917 (1975) Stone won the Wolfson History Prize. He also wrote Hitler (1980), Europe Transformed 1878–1919 (1983), which won the Fontana History of Europe Prize; and World War One: A Short History (2007).

=== Assessments ===
In his obituary of Stone in The Guardian, the historian Richard J. Evans states that unlike Niall Ferguson or A.J.P. Taylor, "Stone's provocations were little more than the voicing of his own personal political prejudices, and so had little or no effect on the way we think about the past". Evans also comments: "Journalists often described [Stone] as 'one of Britain's leading historians', but in truth he was nothing of the kind, as any serious member of the profession will tell you."

In his Oxford Dictionary of National Biography entry on Stone, Lawrence Goldman writes that:

His behaviour was often erratic, his life sometimes chaotic, his promise unfulfilled. He tested to destruction the traditional indulgence of academic brilliance and eccentricity in both Cambridge and Oxford. He retained the admiration and support of a group of younger historians whom he had taught, or whom he inspired as a Conservative historian in a left-leaning profession. They included Niall Ferguson, Orlando Figes, and Andrew Roberts.

Evans quotes with some approval an observation by former prime minister Edward Heath on Stone's time in Oxford: "Many parents of Oxford students must be both horrified and disgusted that the higher education of our children should rest in the hands of such a man." According to David Herman, when Stone heard of Heath's comment he retorted: "Everything good about Britain is due to Lady Thatcher. Everything bad is the fault of Edward Heath."

== Personal life ==
While in Vienna in the 1960s, Stone met (Marie) Nicole Aubry, the niece of the finance minister in "Papa Doc" Duvalier's Haiti dictatorship. They married on 2 July 1966 and had two sons, Nick (born 1966), a thriller writer, and Sebastian (born 1972). Stone and his first wife divorced in 1977. On 11 August 1982, he married Christine Margaret Booker (née Verity), a leading member of the British Helsinki Human Rights Group. They had a son, Rupert (born 1983), and remained married until her death in 2016.

According to Evans, Stone suffered from alcoholism and was accused of groping female students.

He owned a house in the Galata neighbourhood of Istanbul, and divided his time between Turkey and England, although he spent the last years of his life in Budapest.

== In popular culture ==
The protagonist of Robert Harris's novel Archangel (1998) is based on Stone.

Another thinly veiled version of Stone appears in Charles Beaumont's novel A Spy Alone (2023) as Peter Mackenzie, a hard-drinking Oxford historian with right-wing views and connections who once tried to smuggle a dissident over the Iron Curtain in the boot of his car.

== Published works ==
- The Eastern Front, 1914–1917 (1975); ISBN 0-340-12874-7
- Hitler (1980); ISBN 0-340-24980-3 Hodder and Stoughton
- Europe Transformed, 1878–1919 (1983), ISBN 0-00-634262-0; 2nd ed. (1999); ISBN 0-631-21507-7
- The Makers of English History (1987), ISBN 0-297-78933-3 (ed.) Weidenfeld and Nicolson
- Czechoslovakia: Crossroads and Crises, 1918–88 (1989); ISBN 0-333-48507-6
- The Times Atlas of World History (1989); ISBN 0-7230-0304-1 (ed.)
- The Other Russia (1990); ISBN 0-571-13574-9 (with Michael Glenny)
- "Turkey in the Russian Mirror" in Ljubica Erickson and Mark Erickson (ed.), Russia: War, Peace and Diplomacy. Essays in Honour of John Erickson, London: Weidenfeld & Nicolson, 2005, pp. 86–100.
- Islam in Turkey, in Caroline Y. Robertson-von Trotha (ed.), Europa in der Welt – die Welt in Europa (= Kulturwissenschaft interdisziplinär/Interdisciplinary Studies on Culture and Society, Vol. 1), Baden-Baden: Nomos, 2006, pp. 139–145.; ISBN 978-3-8329-1934-4
- World War One: a Short History (2007); ISBN 1-84614-013-7 Penguin Press
- The Atlantic and Its Enemies: A Personal History of the Cold War (2010); ISBN 978-1-84614-275-8 Allen Lane
- Turkey: a Short History (2010), ISBN 0-500-25175-4; Thames & Hudson
- World War Two: a Short History (2013), Allen Lane/Basic Books
- Hungary: a Short History (2019), Profile Books
