= Church of the Archangel =

Church of the Archangel(s) or Church of the Holy Archangel(s) and other variants may refer to:

== Armenia ==
- Church of the Holy Archangels, Vagharshapat

== Azerbaijan ==
- Church of Michael the Archangel, Baku

== Bulgaria ==
- Church of the Holy Archangels Michael and Gabriel, Nesebar

== France ==
- Church of the Holy Archangels, Paris

== Georgia ==
- Ikorta Church of the Archangel

== Israel ==
- Church of the Holy Archangels, Jerusalem (Armenian)

== Poland ==
- Church of the Archangel Michael, Warsaw

== Romania ==
- Church of the Holy Archangels, Blaj
- Church of the Holy Archangels Michael and Gabriel, Brăila
- Churches of the Holy Archangels, Carei
- Church of the Holy Archangels, Focșani
- Church of the Holy Archangels (Stamatinești), Focșani
- Church of the Holy Archangels, Pașcani
- Church of the Archangels Michael and Gabriel, Plopiș
- Church of the Holy Archangels, Rogoz
- Church of the Holy Archangels, Satulung
- Church of the Archangels Michael and Gabriel, Șurdești
- Church of the Holy Archangels, Târgu Jiu

== Ukraine ==
- Church of the Archangel Michael, Uzhok

== See also ==
- St. Michael the Archangel's Church (disambiguation)
