= St. Michael the Archangel's Church =

St. Michael the Archangel's Church may refer to:

== Czech Republic ==
- Church of Saint Michael the Archangel in Prague
- Archangel Michael's Church (Znojmo)

== Kyrgyzstan ==
- St. Michael the Archangel Church, Bishkek
- Church of the Holy Archangel Michael, Kokshetau

== Lithuania ==
- Church of St. Michael the Archangel, Gargždai
- Church of St. Michael the Archangel, Kaunas
- Church of St. Michael, Vilnius

== Poland ==
- St. Michael Archangel's Church, Binarowa
- St. Michael Archangel's Church, Brunary
- St. Michael the Archangel Church, Ciechocinek
- St. Michael Archangel's Church, Dębno
- Church of St. Michael the Archangel, Katowice
- St. Michael Archangel's Church, Smolnik
- St. Michael Archangel's Church, Turzańsk
- Church of the Archangel Michael, Warsaw

== Russia ==
- Church of Michael the Archangel (Kamenolomni), Rostov
- St. Michael the Archangel's Church, Novopyshminskoye, Sverdlovsk

== Ukraine ==
- Church of the Archangel Michael, Chernihiv
- Church of the Archangel Michael, Uzhok

== United Kingdom ==
- Church of St Michael the Archangel, Aldershot, Hampshire
- St Michael the Archangel's Church, Booton, Norfolk
- St Michael the Archangel's Church, Chagford, Devon
- St Michael the Archangel Church, Chatham, Kent
- Church of St Michael the Archangel, Compton Martin, Somerset
- St Michael the Archangel's Church, Framlingham, Suffolk
- St Michael the Archangel's Church, Halam, Nottinghamshire
- St Michael the Archangel's Church, Laxton, Nottinghamshire
- Newquay Parish Church of St Michael the Archangel, Cornwall
- St Michael the Archangel's Church, Retford, Nottinghamshire
- Church of St Michael the Archangel, Shalfleet, Isle of Wight
- St Michael and All Angels' Church, Hathersage, Derbyshire
- St Michael the Archangel Roman Catholic Church, Hathersage, Derbyshire

== United States ==
- St. Michael the Archangel Ukrainian Catholic Church, Baltimore, Maryland
- St. Michael the Archangel's Parish (Bridgeport, Connecticut)
- Saint Michael the Archangel Catholic Church (Chicago), Illinois
- St. Michael the Archangel Church (Cincinnati, Ohio)
- St. Michael the Archangel Church (Cleveland, Ohio)
- St. Michael the Archangel Church (Cordova, Alaska)
- St. Michael the Archangel Church (Kailua-Kona, Hawaii)
- St. Michael the Archangel Church, Madison, Indiana
- Saint Michael the Archangel Church (Monroe, Michigan)
- Monastery and Church of Saint Michael the Archangel Union City, New Jersey

== Elsewhere ==
- Church of Michael the Archangel, Baku, Azerbaijan
- Church of St. Archangel Michael, Veličani, Bosnia and Herzegovina
- Saint Michael the Archangel Serbian Orthodox Church (Toronto), Ontario, Canada
- Church of St. Michael the Archangel, Ilok, Croatia
- St. Michael the Archangel Church (Cannes), France
- San Michele Arcangelo, Venice, Italy
- Church of the Holy Archangel Michael, Kokshetau, Kazakhstan
- Church St. Archangel Michael, Kumanovo, North Macedonia
- Church of the Saint Archangel Michael, Darda Serbia
- Church of Saint Michael the Archangel of Ladomirová, Slovakia

== See also ==
- Church of the Archangel (disambiguation)
