= Znojmo =

Town in the Czech Republic

- Town
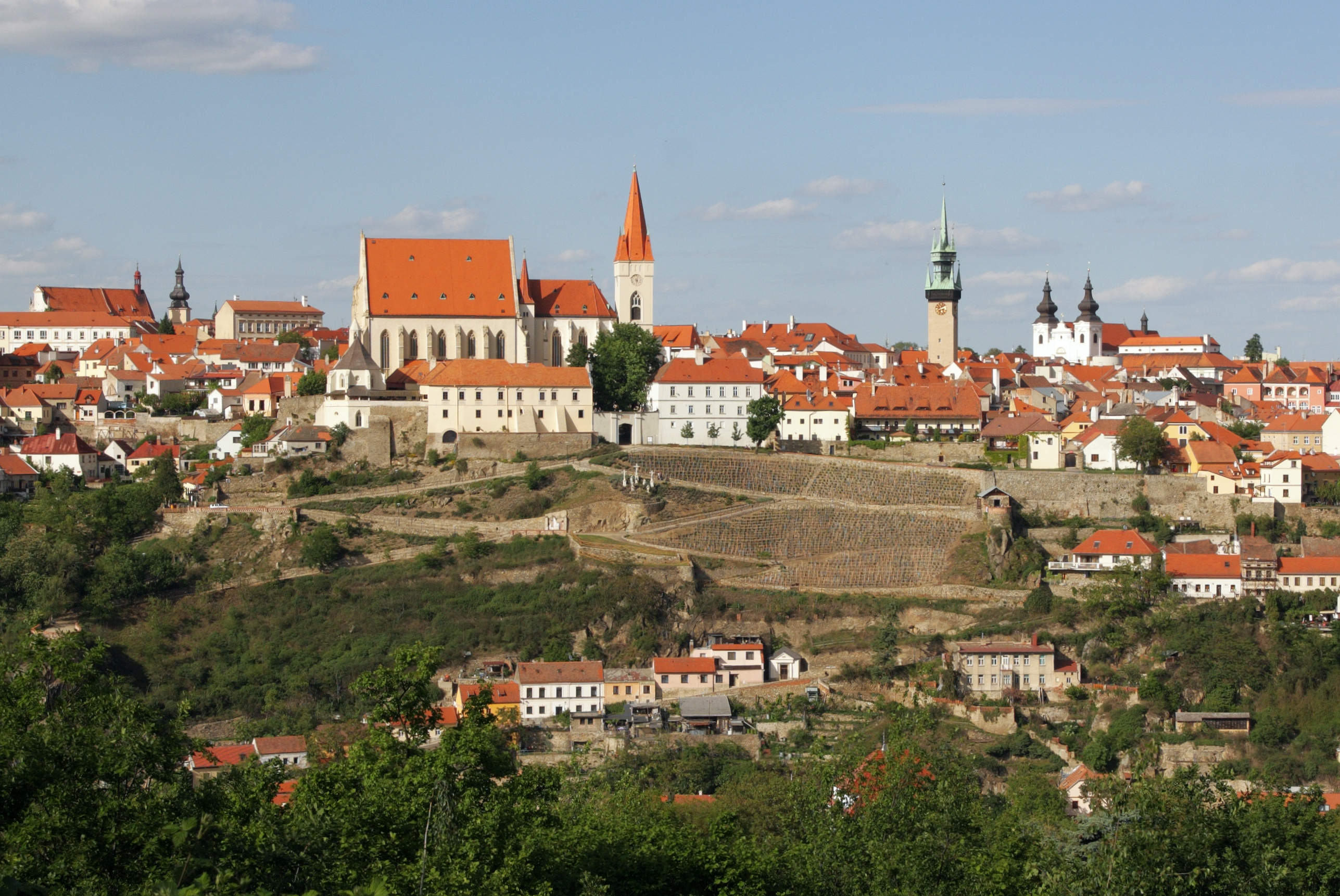
- View from the south

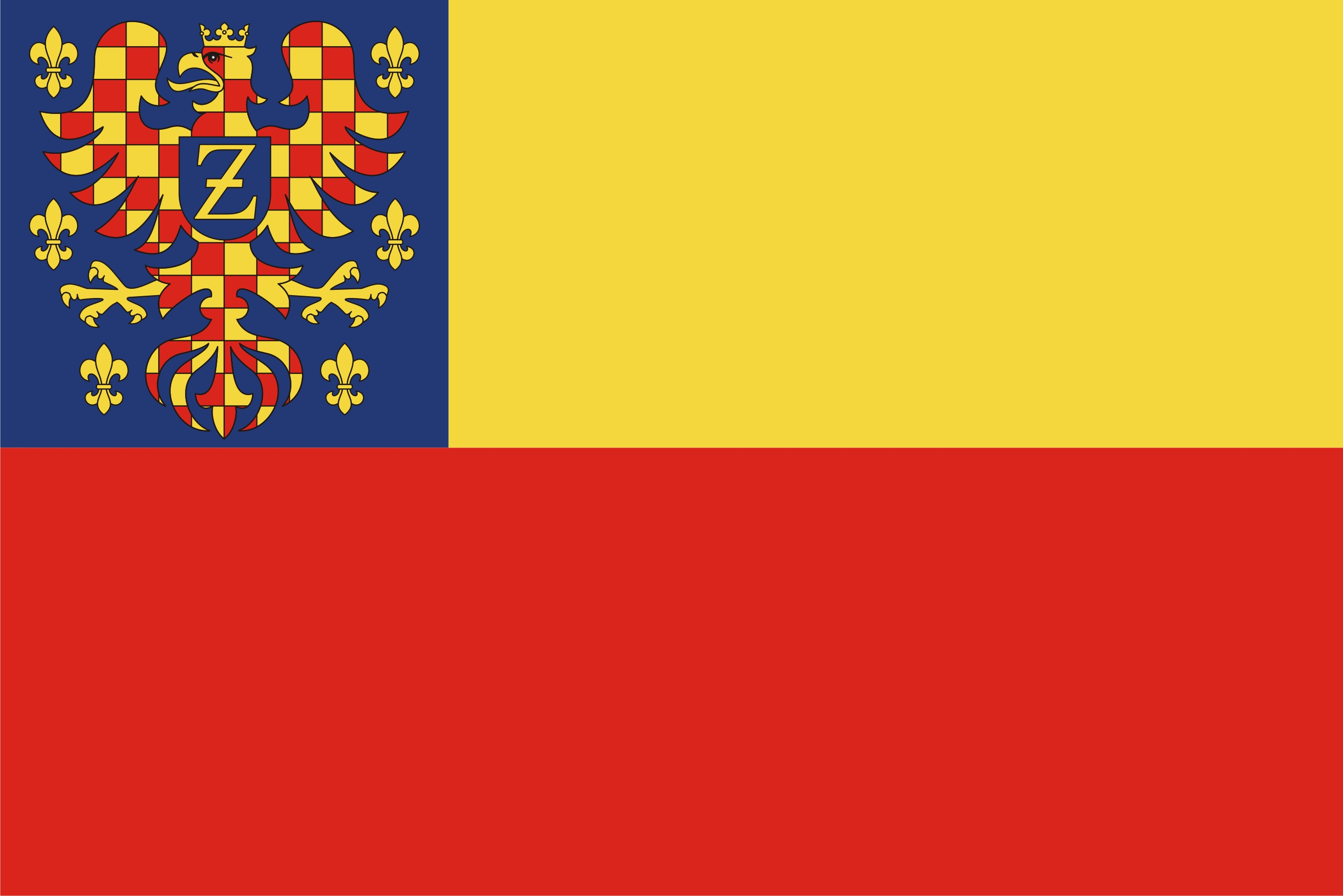
- Flag Coat of arms

- Location in the Czech Republic
- Coordinates: 48°51′20″N 16°2′56″E
- Country: Czech Republic
- Region: South Moravia
- District: Znojmo
- First mentioned: 1226

Government
  - Mayor: František Koudela

Area
  - Total: 65.90 km^{2} (25.44 sq mi)
- Elevation: 290 m (950 ft)

Population (2026-01-01)
  - Total: 33,989
  - Density: 515.8/km^{2} (1,336/sq mi)
- Time zone: UTC+1 (CET)
  - Summer (DST): UTC+2 (CEST)
- Postal code: 669 02
- Website: www.znojmocity.cz

Znojmo (Czech pronunciation: [ˈznojmo]; German: Znaim) is a town in the South Moravian Region of the Czech Republic. It has about 34,000 inhabitants. The town is located on the Thaya River, along the eastern edge of Podyjí National Park. Znojmo is the historical and cultural centre of southwestern Moravia and the second most populated town in the South Moravian Region.

The town of Znojmo and its surroundings are known for gherkin production and for winemaking. Znojmo was founded shortly before 1226, but the Znojmo Castle is older. The historic town centre is well preserved and is protected as an urban monument reservation. The most important monuments, protected as national cultural monuments, are Rotunda of Saint Catherine, Louka Monastery and Town Hall Tower.

== Administrative division ==
Znojmo consists of nine municipal parts (in brackets population according to the 2021 census):

- Znojmo (26,634)
- Derflice (114)
- Kasárna (158)
- Konice (383)
- Mramotice (397)
- Načeratice (340)
- Oblekovice (1,299)
- Popice (187)
- Přímětice (4,224)

== Etymology ==
The origin of the town's name is uncertain. According to the most likely theories, it was derived either from the Old Czech words znoj (i.e. 'heat') and znojný ('exposed to heat'), or from the personal name Znojem or Znojim.

== Geography ==
Znojmo is located about 54 kilometres (34 mi) southwest of Brno, near the border with Austria. It lies mostly in the Jevišovice Uplands, with only a small part of the municipal territory in the south extending into the Dyje–Svratka Valley. The highest point is at 397 m (1,302 ft) above sea level. The town is situated mainly on a rock outcropping on the steep left bank of the Thaya River. The western part of the municipal territory lies within the Podyjí National Park.

== History ==
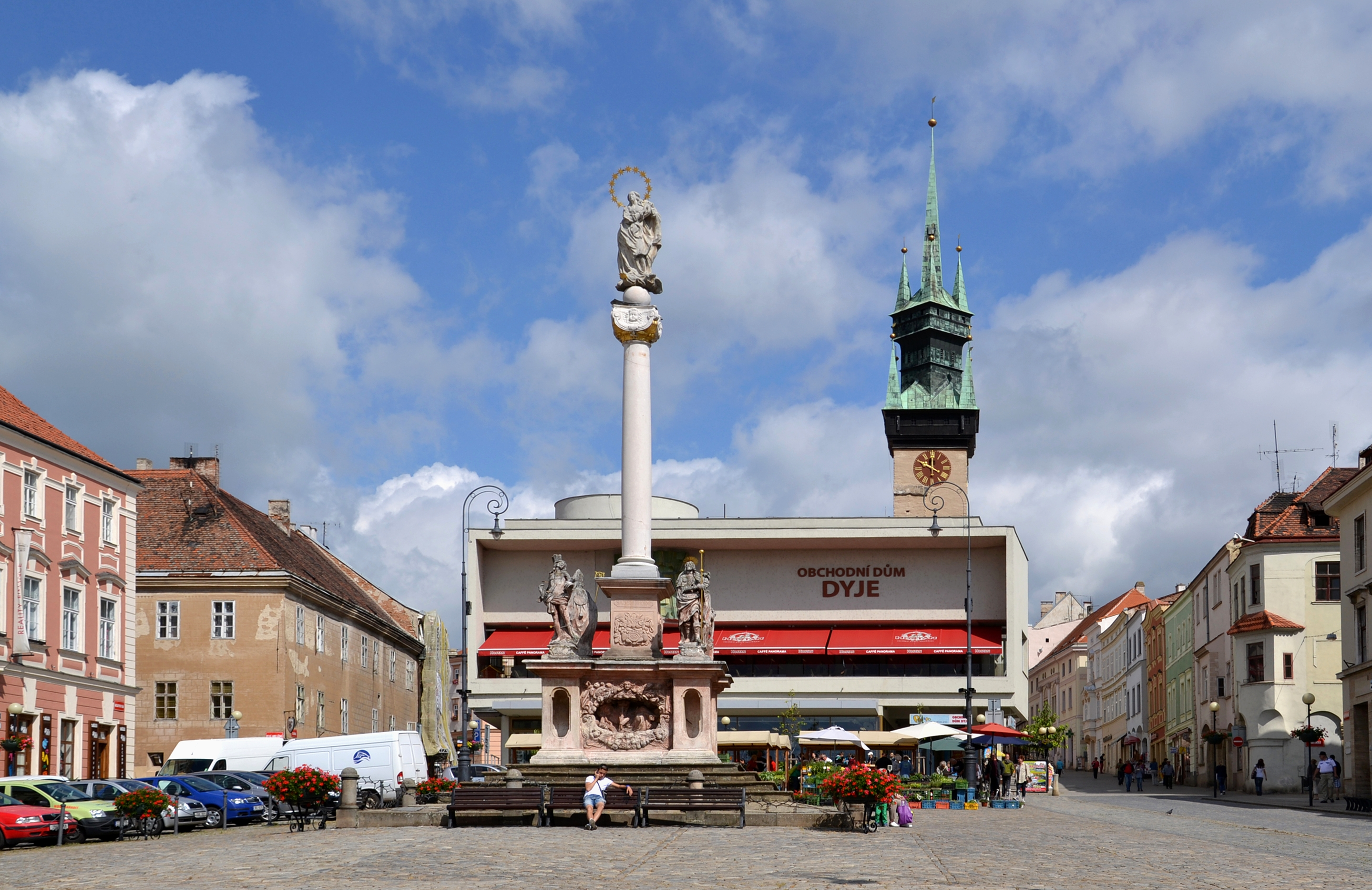
Column commemorating the plague

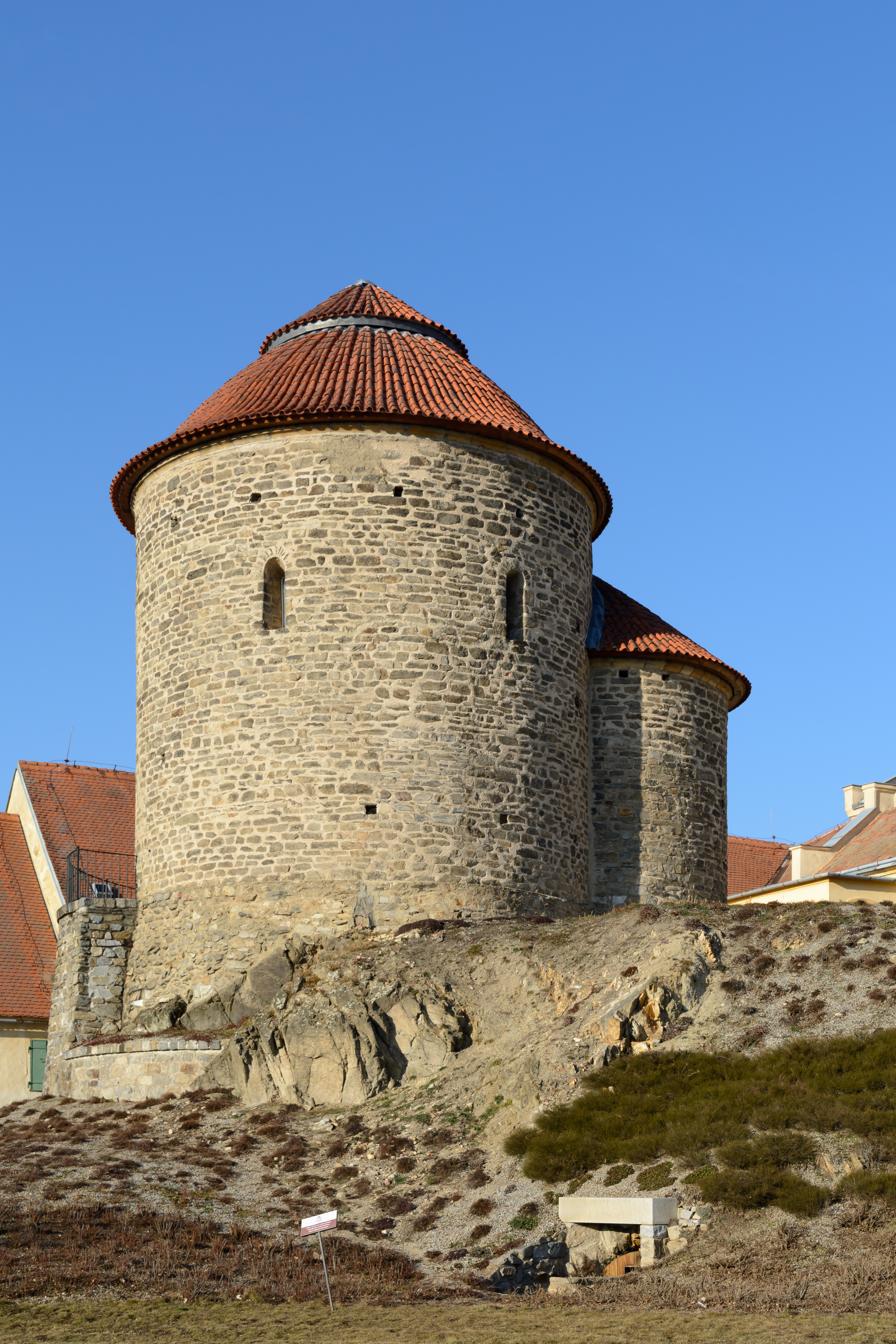
Rotunda of Saint Catherine

A settlement at the site possibly already existed during the time of the Great Moravian Empire in the 9th century, however, the main Great Moravian gord was situated on the hill across the brook Gránický potok. The gord was one of the first places in Moravia where Christianity appeared. After 1029, the gord served as the residence of a Přemyslid principality within the Bohemian March of Moravia and a strategically important outpost near the border with the Bavarian March of Austria in the south. Around 1100, the administrative centre was moved from the gord to a new castle, today known as the Znojmo Castle. In 1101, Moravian Duke Luitpold of Znojmo built the Rotunda of Saint Catherine in the castle.

The Znojmo Castle was seized and demolished by Duke Vladislaus II of Bohemia in 1145. In 1190, Duke Conrad II founded the Louka Monastery of the Premonstratensian order at Znojmo.

The first written mention of Znojmo is from 1226. The royal town of Znojmo was founded shortly before 1226 by King Ottokar I of Bohemia on the plains in front of the rebuilt castle and was fortified. It was one of the first royal towns in Moravia.

Znojmo survived the Hussite Wars unscathed, when the Hussites failed to capture the town, and prospered. In the 15th and 16th centuries, networks of burgher houses with a system of underground passages were built as a part of the fortifications. The Renaissance and late Gothic houses are preserved to this day. At that time, the town was ethnically mixed Czech-German and the burghers were mainly German speaking. The development of the town ended with the Thirty Years' War. Znojmo was conquered and ransacked repeatedly. It took over a hundred years for the town to recover.

From the 19th century, Znojmo is best known as the site for the Armistice of Znaim concluded there on 12 July 1809 after the Battle of Znaim, following the decisive Battle of Wagram, between Emperor Napoleon and the archduke Charles, which had taken place seven days earlier.

Since the end of World War I, Znojmo was within the newly established state of Czechoslovakia, except for 1938–1945 during the Nazi German occupation when it was administered as part of the Reichsgau Niederdonau. The German population of the town was expelled after World War II according to the Beneš decrees.

== Demographics ==
Historical population

Year	Pop.	±%
1869	15,606	—
1880	18,740	+20.1%
1890	21,153	+12.9%
1900	23,316	+10.2%
1910	25,840	+10.8%

Year	Pop.	±%
1921	25,993	+0.6%
1930	30,794	+18.5%
1950	25,146	−18.3%
1961	27,456	+9.2%
1970	29,645	+8.0%

Year	Pop.	±%
1980	34,550	+16.5%
1991	36,134	+4.6%
2001	35,758	−1.0%
2011	34,122	−4.6%
2021	33,736	−1.1%

Source: Censuses

== Economy ==
Znojmo is famous for local production of gherkins, pickled in the original sweet-sour and spicy pickle, whose cultivation in the Znojmo region was introduced in 1571 by the abbot of the Louka Monastery, George II. The special taste is also the result of local type of cucumbers, cultivation method, soil, climatic conditions, processing and also the packaging in which they are kept.

Thanks to the favorable climatic conditions, the town is also successful in winery and fruit growing. It is the centre of viticulture of the Znojemská wine sub-region.

== Transport ==
The I/38 (part of the European route E59) from Jihlava to the Czech–Austrian border passes through Znojmo. It forks in the centre of Znojmo and connects the town with Brno as the I/53 road.

There is a railway station with railway lines leading in three directions: to Vienna in Austria, to Břeclav and to Okříšky.

== Culture ==
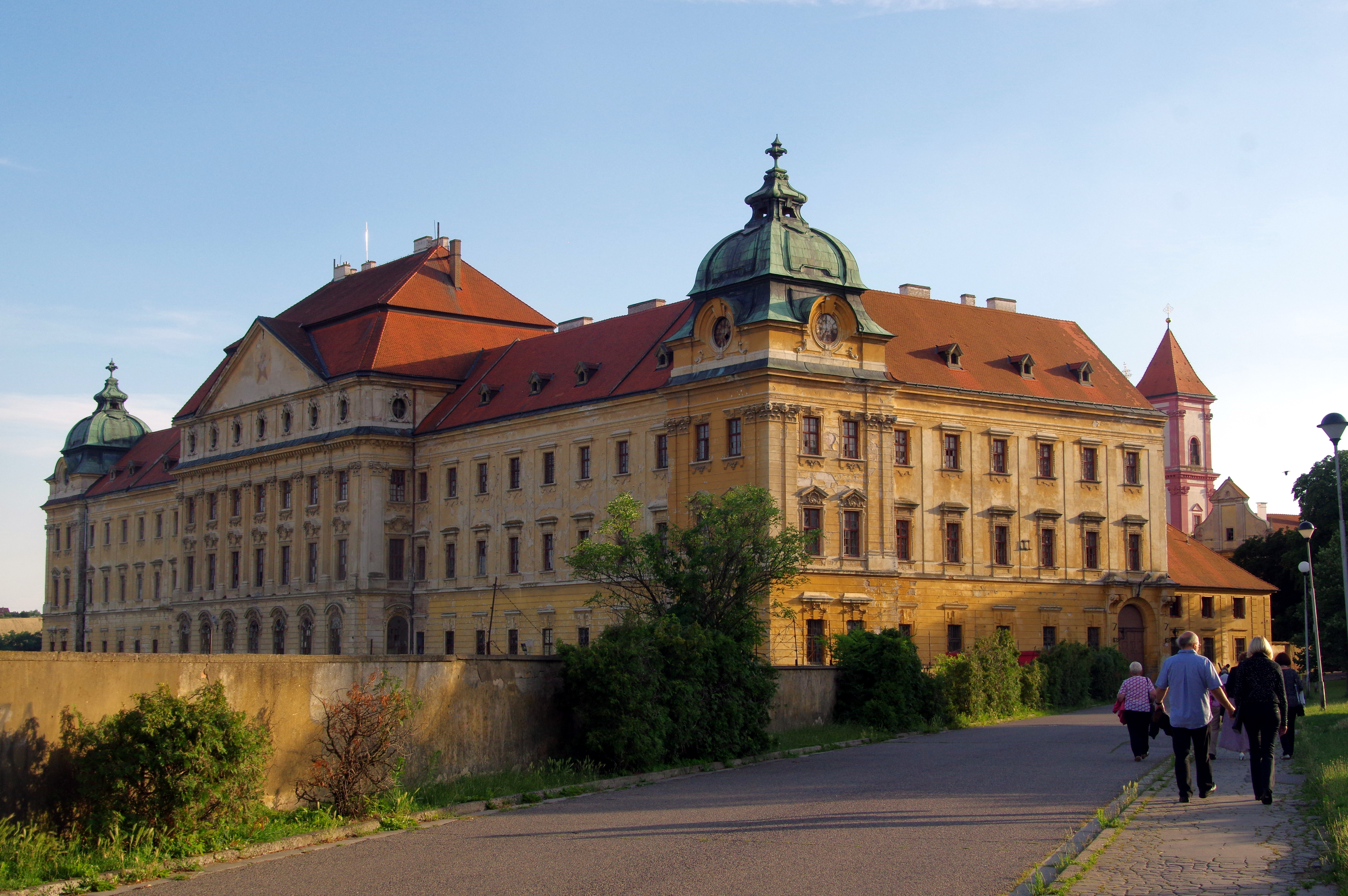
Louka Monastery

Znojmo is known for its Znojmo Vintage Festival which takes place every September. The main attraction of the festival is the historical parade commemorating the visit of King John of Bohemia to Znojmo in 1327.

The annual Gherkin Feast is dedicated to tradition of growing gherkins in the region.

== Sport ==
The town is home to 1. SC Znojmo FK. In the 2013–14 season, the club played in the Czech First League, but since 2019, it has been playing in the lower amateur tiers.

Orli Znojmo is an ice hockey club playing in the Czech 2nd Liga (third tier).

== Sights ==
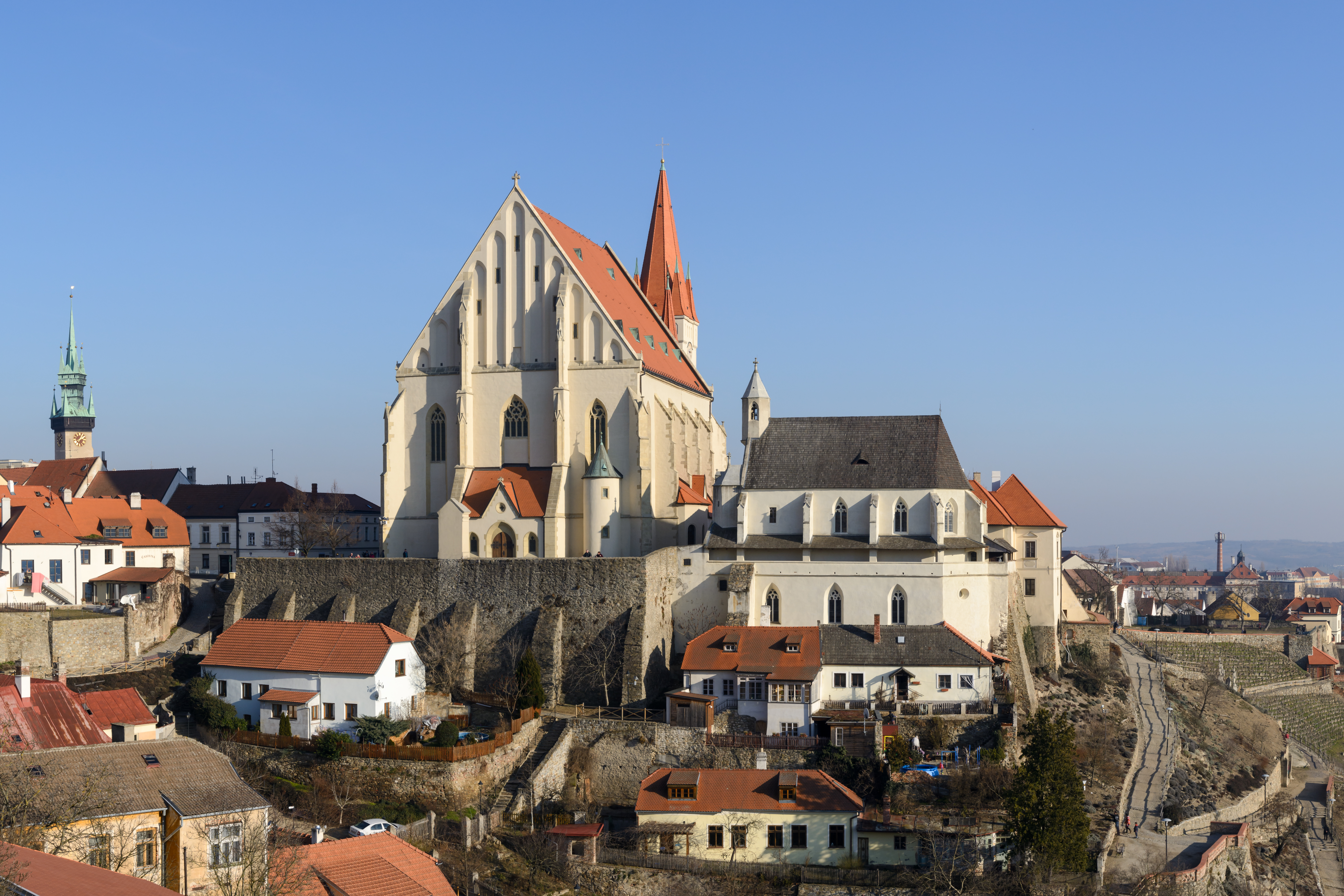
Church of Saint Nicholas

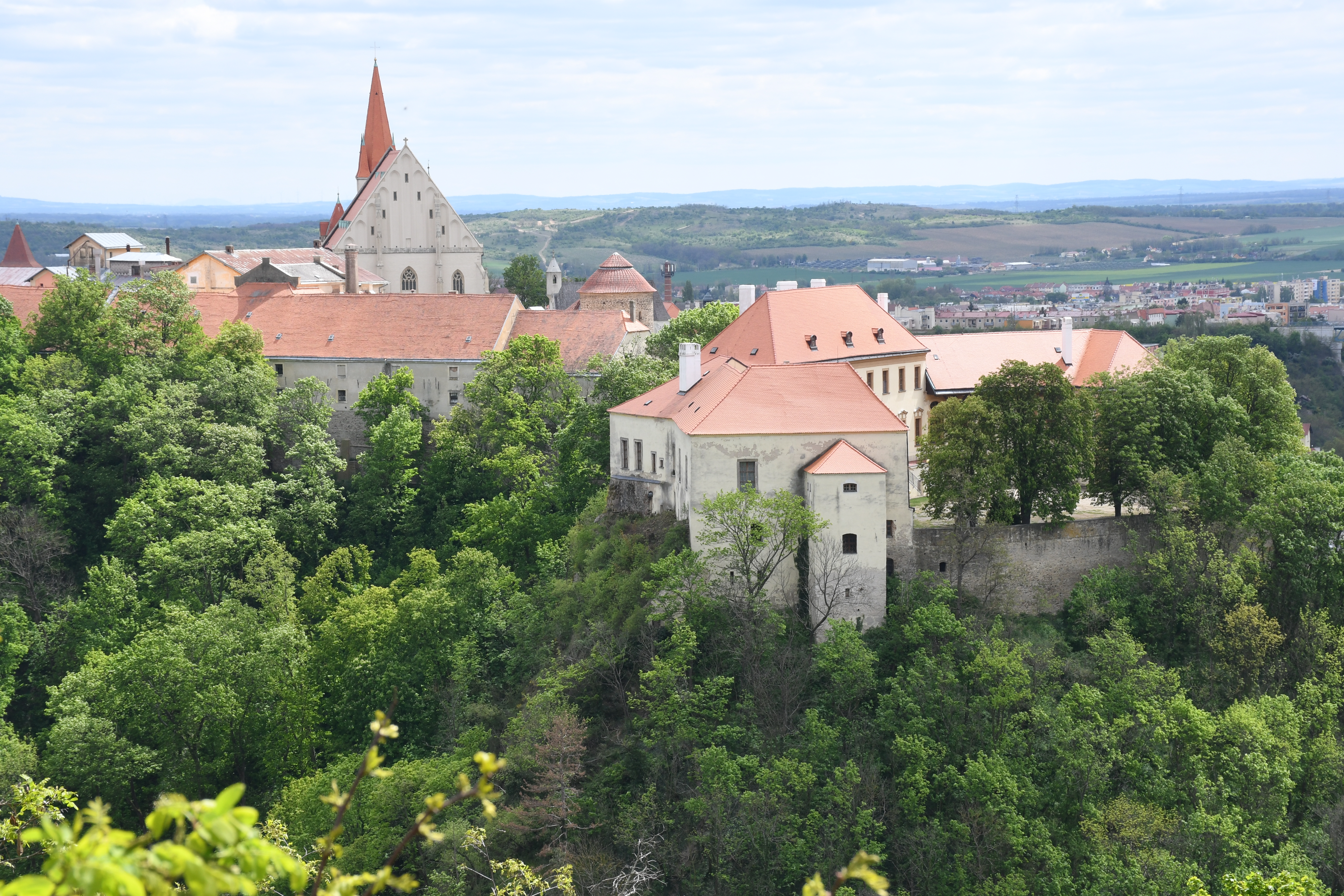
Znojmo Castle

The Gothic Church of St. Nicholas and the late Gothic Town Hall tower are the most recognizable landmarks. The original church was founded in around 1100, and replaced by a new church gradually built from 1338 until the late 15th century. The town hall with its 80 m (260 ft) high tower was built in 1445–1448. Since 2024, the town has been protected as a national cultural monument.

Overlooking the Thaya River valley, on the edge of the medieval city, is the Znojmo Castle, which was founded by the Přemyslid dukes in the 11th century. The only remaining trace of this castle is the Romanesque Rotunda of Saint Catherine, the interior of which is covered with 11th-century frescoes depicting scenes from the Bible and illustrating the life of Přemysl the Ploughman. The rotunda is one of three national cultural monuments in the town.

Beneath the grounds of the old town, there is a vast labyrinth of connected passageways and cellars called the Znojmo Catacombs. This system was developed in the 14th and 15th centuries for defence purposes, and it contains wells, drainage, fireplaces, trap doors and escapeways that lead beyond the fortifications of the town. The catacombs are the largest system of underground corridors and cellars in the Czech Republic – they are almost 27 km (17 mi) long and up to 4 levels deep.

The Church of Saint Michael the Archangel was probably built in the 12th century. It is the second most significant church in the town, after Church of Saint Nicholas. The church was first mentioned in 1226 and completely rebuilt in the late Gothic style in 1508. It is considered a monument of national importance.

=== Louka Monastery ===
The Premonstratensian Louka Monastery is among the most valuable buildings in Znojmo. The monastery was founded in 1190, but the current monastery building was built in two phases in the years 1748–1756 and 1761–1778. Architecturally, it is a monument of transnational importance, protected as a national cultural monument. The monastery complex includes the Church of the Assumption of the Virgin Mary and Saint Wenceslaus. It is originally a Romanesque basilica with a Gothic presbytery, which was rebuilt in the Baroque style at the end of the 17th century.

== Notable people ==
- Sigismund, Holy Roman Emperor (1368–1437), King of Bohemia; died here
- Prokop Diviš (1698–1765), inventor, catholic priest; served here in 1736–1741
- Clement Mary Hofbauer, C.Ss.R. (1751–1820), Redemptorist priest and saint; served here as an apprentice baker in 1767–1770
- Charles Sealsfield (1793–1864), German-American writer and lawyer
- Hugo Lederer (1871–1940), sculptor
- Otte Wallish (1903–1977), Israeli graphic designer
- Anna Spitzmüller (1903–2001), art historian and curator
- Emil Kotrba (1912–1983), painter
- Edith Körner (1921–2000), British magistrate
- Franz Woidich (1921–2004), German fighter pilot
- Petr Rosol (born 1964), ice hockey player
- Jitka Schneiderová (born 1973), actress
- Květoslav Svoboda (born 1982), swimmer
- Michal Ordoš (born 1983), footballer
- Jiří Orság (born 1989), weightlifter
- Andrea Stašková (born 2000), footballer

== Twin towns – sister cities ==
Znojmo is twinned with:

- Chrudim, Czech Republic
- Nové Zámky, Slovakia
- Pontassieve, Italy
- Povo (Trento), Italy
- Retz, Austria
- Ružinov (Bratislava), Slovakia
- Strzegom, Poland
- Torgau, Germany
- Villazzano (Trento), Italy
