= Neculai Rățoi =

Romanian politician (1939–2016)

Mayor of Pașcani
- In office 1981–2008
- Succeeded by: Grigore Crăciunescu

Personal details
- Born: March 15, 1939 Pașcani, Romania
- Died: April 25, 2016 (aged 77) Pașcani, Romania
- Party: Social Democratic Party
- Children: 1
- Education: Bucharest Academy of Economic Studies
- Occupation: Politician
- Profession: Mechanic

Neculai Rățoi (March 15, 1939 – April 25, 2016) was a Romanian politician who served as the mayor of Pașcani from 1981–2008 and as a member of the Chamber of Deputies of Romania from 2008 to 2012. He was a member of the Social Democratic Party.

Rățoi worked for many years as a locomotive engineer at the CFR Depot Pașcani. He was decorated in February 1973 with the Order of Labor, 1st class.
