= Znojmo Castle =

Castle in Znojmo, Czech Republic

Coordinates: 48°51′20.49″N 16°2′32.96″E

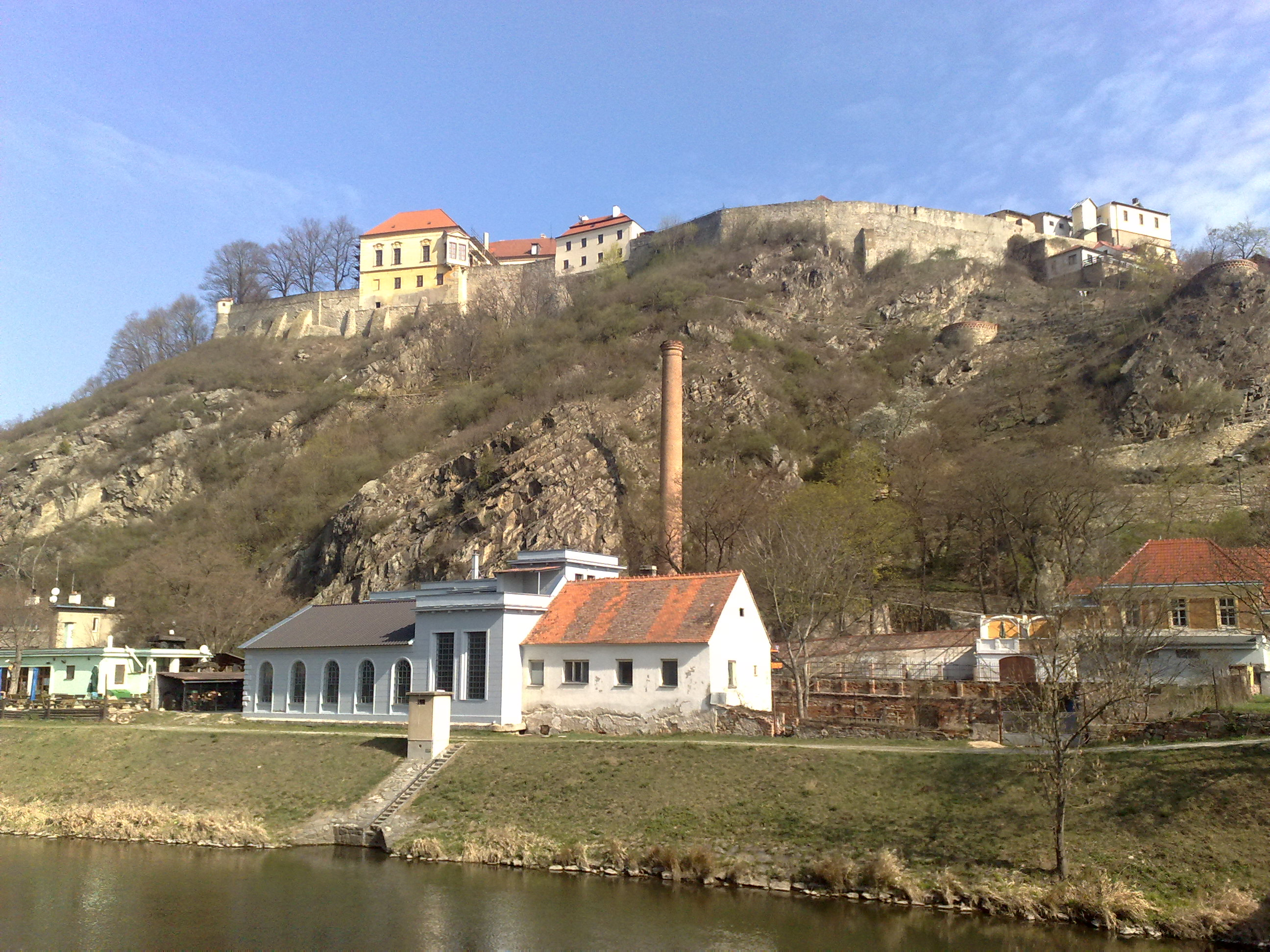
Znojmo Castle

Znojmo Castle is a castle in Znojmo in the South Moravian Region of the Czech Republic.

== History ==
The Znojmo Castle was initially a wooden structure built by the Přemyslid Duke Bretislav I, and completed around 1080. The structure was intended to replace an old castle across the Granice Valley, as part of an attempt at strengthening the defenses along the river Thaya against Austrian attack. From the new castle the river valley and surrounding area could be observed. However, in 1140, the wooden castle was besieged and destroyed.

Towards the end of the 12th century, the castle was reconstructed, this time in stone, and included a deep moat. The entrance to the castle was guarded by an octagonal tower called the Robber's Tower, which collapsed due to neglect at the end of the 19th century.

The Royal Town of Znojmo was founded by King Ottokar I of Bohemia and the Znojmo castle became the town's stronghold, connected to the town walls and containing a strong garrison of soldiers.

The importance of Znojmo Castle diminished near the end of the 17th century, after the Turkish threat was averted by Prince Eugene of Savoy. The Holy Roman Emperor Joseph I redeemed the castle in 1710.

The front end of the castle was sold to local citizens and became the town brewery, producing Hostan beer. The rear of the castle came into the hands of the Lords of Deblin who built a Baroque chateau on the space, which still stands.

The only remains of the castle used by the Přemysl dukes is the Romanesque Rotunda of Saint Catherine, the interior of which is covered with 11th-century frescoes depicting biblical scenes and illustrating the life of Přemysl.
