= Pașcani =

- Municipality
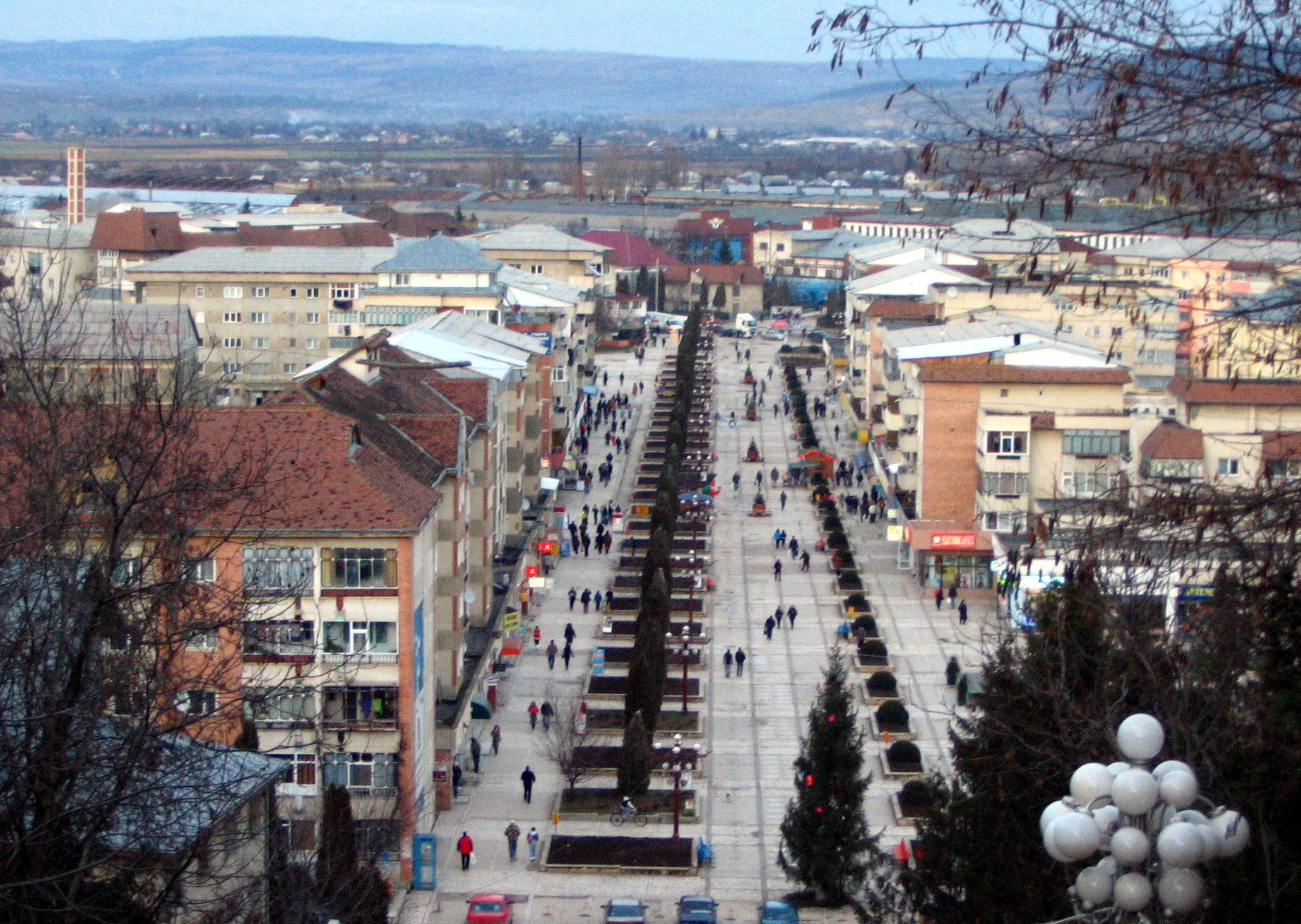
- A part of Pașcani seen from the stairway that links the uphill area to the valley

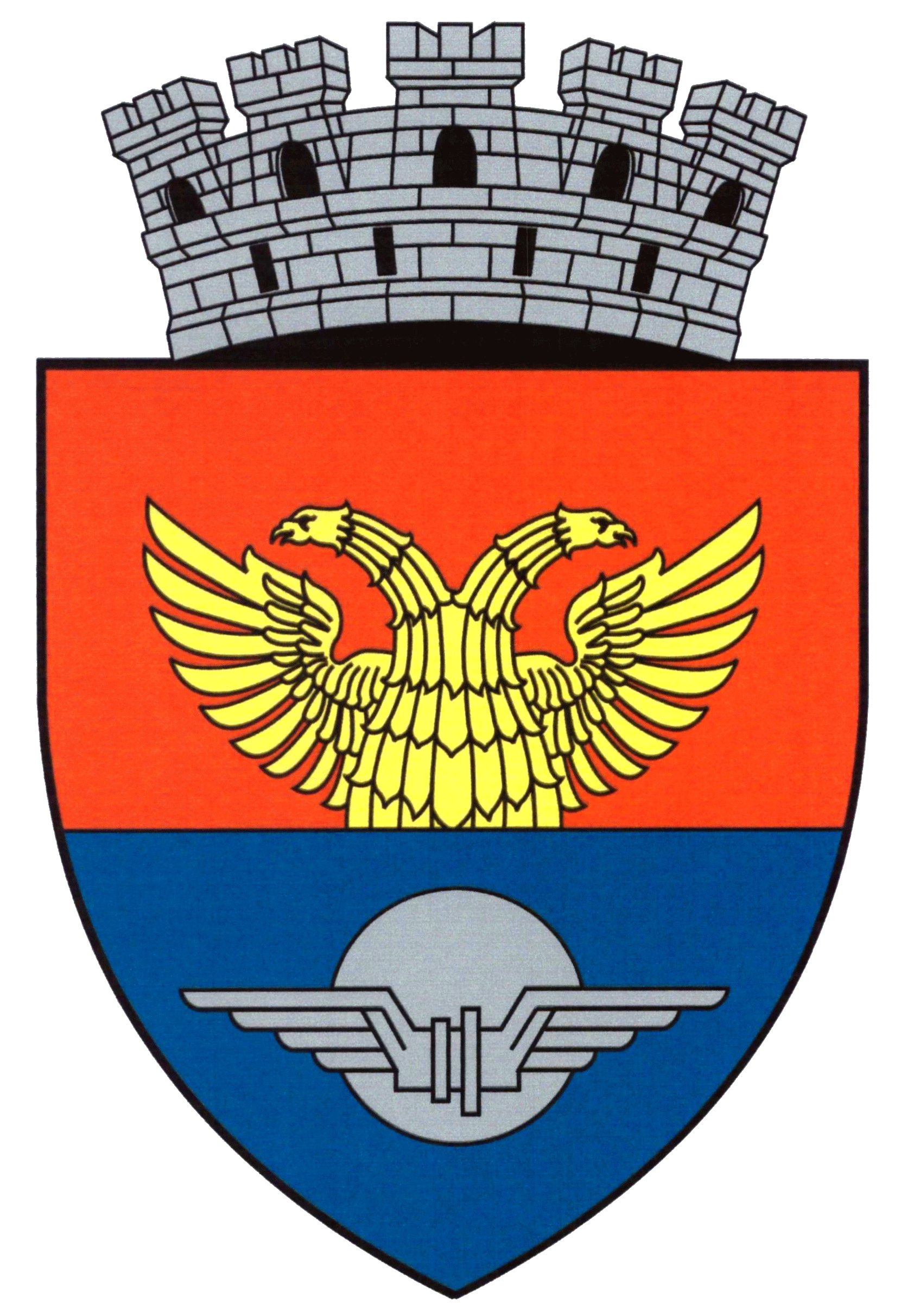
- Coat of arms

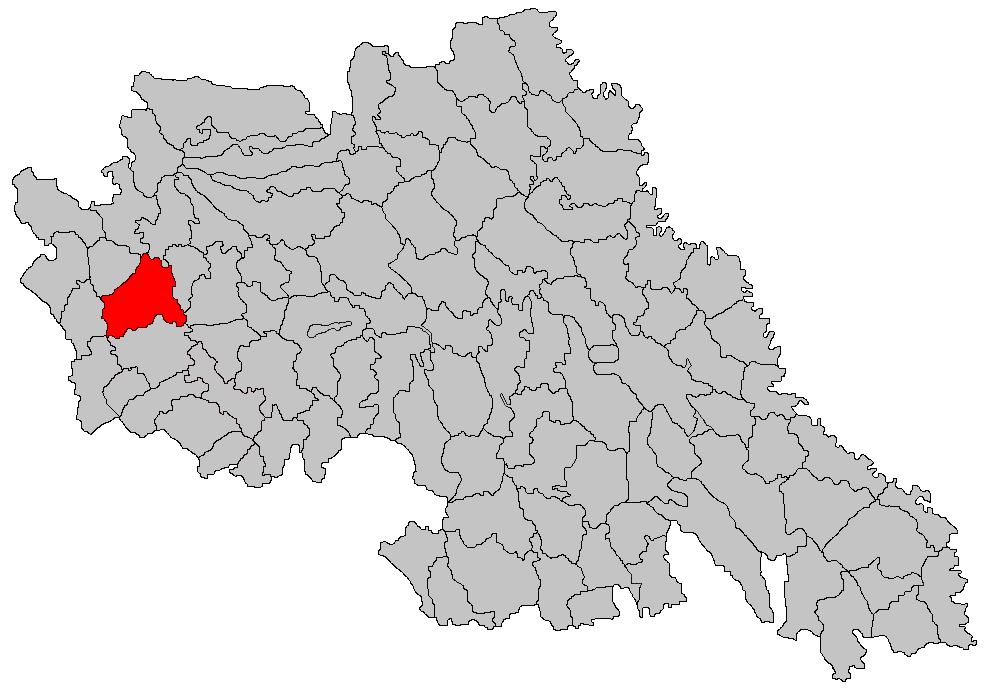
- Location in Iași County

- Location in Romania
- Coordinates: 47°14′58″N 26°43′38″E
- Country: Romania
- County: Iași

Government
  - Mayor (2024–2028): Marius-Nicolae Pintilie (PNL)
- Area: 75.42 km^{2} (29.12 sq mi)
- Elevation: 230 m (750 ft)
- Highest elevation: 250 m (820 ft)
- Lowest elevation: 210 m (690 ft)
- Population (2021-12-01): 30,766
  - Density: 407.9/km^{2} (1,057/sq mi)
- Time zone: UTC+02:00 (EET)
  - Summer (DST): UTC+03:00 (EEST)
- Postal code: 705200
- Area code: (+40) 02 32
- Vehicle reg.: IS
- Website: www.primariapascani.ro

Pașcani (Romanian pronunciation: [paʃˈkanʲ]) is a city in Iași County in the Western Moldavia region of Romania, on the Siret river. As of 2021, it had a population of 30,766. Five villages are administered by the city: Blăgești, Boșteni, Gâstești, Lunca, and Sodomeni.

The city derived its name from the estate of the boyar Oană Pașca. It is the city where Mihail Sadoveanu's novel The Place Where Nothing Happened takes place. An important local site is the Church of the Holy Archangels.

Pașcani is a key node in the Căile Ferate Române rail network; its train station serves the CFR main lines 500 and 600.

== Geography ==
Pașcani is located in north-eastern Romania, in the western part of Iași County. The municipality lies in the southern part of the Suceava Plateau, with the Siret River valley forming the central axis of its landscape.

The municipality's terrain comprises three main geographical subdivisions: the Fălticeni Plateau (also known as the Moțca Plateau), characterised by hilly ridges exceeding 400-450 meters in elevation; the Siret Corridor, consisting of the river's floodplain and terraces, at approximately 205-215 meters above sea level; and the Dealul Mare Plateau, a landscape of broad hills and plateaus ranging from approximately 225 to 355 meters. The highest elevations within the municipality are found at Runcu Hill (456 m) and Lutăriei Hill (455 m).

The Siret is the principal river in the area, flowing from north to south through the eastern part of the municipality. Its valley is relatively broad, and the local hydrographic network also includes several smaller tributaries and streams, among them Iermolia, Arini, Găștești (Humei), Sodomeni (Hășnășeni), Gura Bădiliței and Hărmăneasca.

== Climate ==
Pașcani has a temperate continental climate with a relatively moderate character. The Siret Valley influences local atmospheric circulation, acting as a corridor through which air masses are channelled across the area.

The average annual temperature is 11.1 °C, having average monthly temperature ranges from −0.8 °C in January to 22.4 °C in July. The average annual precipitation is 594 mm, with a maximum of 920 mm recorded in 1991 and a minimum of 332 mm in 1986.

The highest temperature recorded in Pașcani is 39.0 °C (102.2 °F) on 25 August 2012, while the lowest is −24.0 °C (−11.2 °F) on 14 January 1972.

Climate data for Pașcani (elevation 230 m, 2001–2025 normals)
Month	Jan	Feb	Mar	Apr	May	Jun	Jul	Aug	Sep	Oct	Nov	Dec	Year
Record high °C (°F)	19.0 (66.2)	21.2 (70.2)	27.9 (82.2)	30.5 (86.9)	33.2 (91.8)	36.6 (97.9)	37.8 (100.0)	39.0 (102.2)	36.4 (97.5)	31.1 (88.0)	23.4 (74.1)	19.7 (67.5)	39.0 (102.2)
Mean daily maximum °C (°F)	2.5 (36.5)	4.0 (39.2)	10.0 (50.0)	16.3 (61.3)	21.9 (71.4)	25.5 (77.9)	27.8 (82.0)	27.6 (81.7)	22.3 (72.1)	15.8 (60.4)	9.1 (48.4)	3.8 (38.8)	15.6 (60.0)
Daily mean °C (°F)	−0.8 (30.6)	0.5 (32.9)	5.5 (41.9)	11.1 (52.0)	16.4 (61.5)	20.3 (68.5)	22.4 (72.3)	22.0 (71.6)	17.2 (63.0)	11.2 (52.2)	5.7 (42.3)	0.7 (33.3)	11.0 (51.8)
Mean daily minimum °C (°F)	−4.0 (24.8)	−2.9 (26.8)	1.0 (33.8)	6.0 (42.8)	11.0 (51.8)	15.1 (59.2)	17.0 (62.6)	16.5 (61.7)	12.1 (53.8)	6.6 (43.9)	2.3 (36.1)	−2.3 (27.9)	6.5 (43.8)
Record low °C (°F)	−23.6 (−10.5)	−23.1 (−9.6)	−16.0 (3.2)	−4.5 (23.9)	0.7 (33.3)	6.9 (44.4)	9.6 (49.3)	8.2 (46.8)	3.1 (37.6)	−5.1 (22.8)	−12.0 (10.4)	−18.5 (−1.3)	−23.6 (−10.5)
Average precipitation mm (inches)	23 (0.9)	22 (0.9)	34 (1.3)	48 (1.9)	71 (2.8)	94 (3.7)	89 (3.5)	56 (2.2)	48 (1.9)	49 (1.9)	32 (1.3)	29 (1.1)	595 (23.4)
Average precipitation days (≥ 1.0 mm)	6	5	7	8	11	11	10	8	7	6	6	6	91
Source: Administrația Națională de Meteorologie (MeteoRomania), CC-BY-SA-4.0

Historical population
Year	Pop.	±%
1930	13,968	—
1948	10,857	−22.3%
1956	15,008	+38.2%
1966	18,689	+24.5%
1977	24,459	+30.9%
1992	44,900	+83.6%
2002	42,172	−6.1%
2011	33,745	−20.0%
2021	30,766	−8.8%
Source: Census data

== Natives ==
- Ionuț Bâlbă (b. 1981), footballer
- Constantin Ciopraga (1916–2009), writer
- Alexandru Crețu (b. 1992), footballer
- Octavian Nemescu (1940–2020), composer
- Visarion Puiu (1879–1964), metropolitan bishop of the Romanian Orthodox Church
- Neculai Rățoi (1939–2016), politician who served as the mayor of Pașcani from 1981 to 2008
- Mihail Sadoveanu (1880–1961), novelist, short story writer, journalist, and political figure, who served as acting head of state in 1947–1948 and 1958
- Viorel Sălceanu (b. 1946), footballer
- Vasile Vasilenco (1926–1977), literary critic
