= Church of Saint Michael the Archangel (Znojmo) =

Coordinates: 48°51′30″N 16°2′50″E

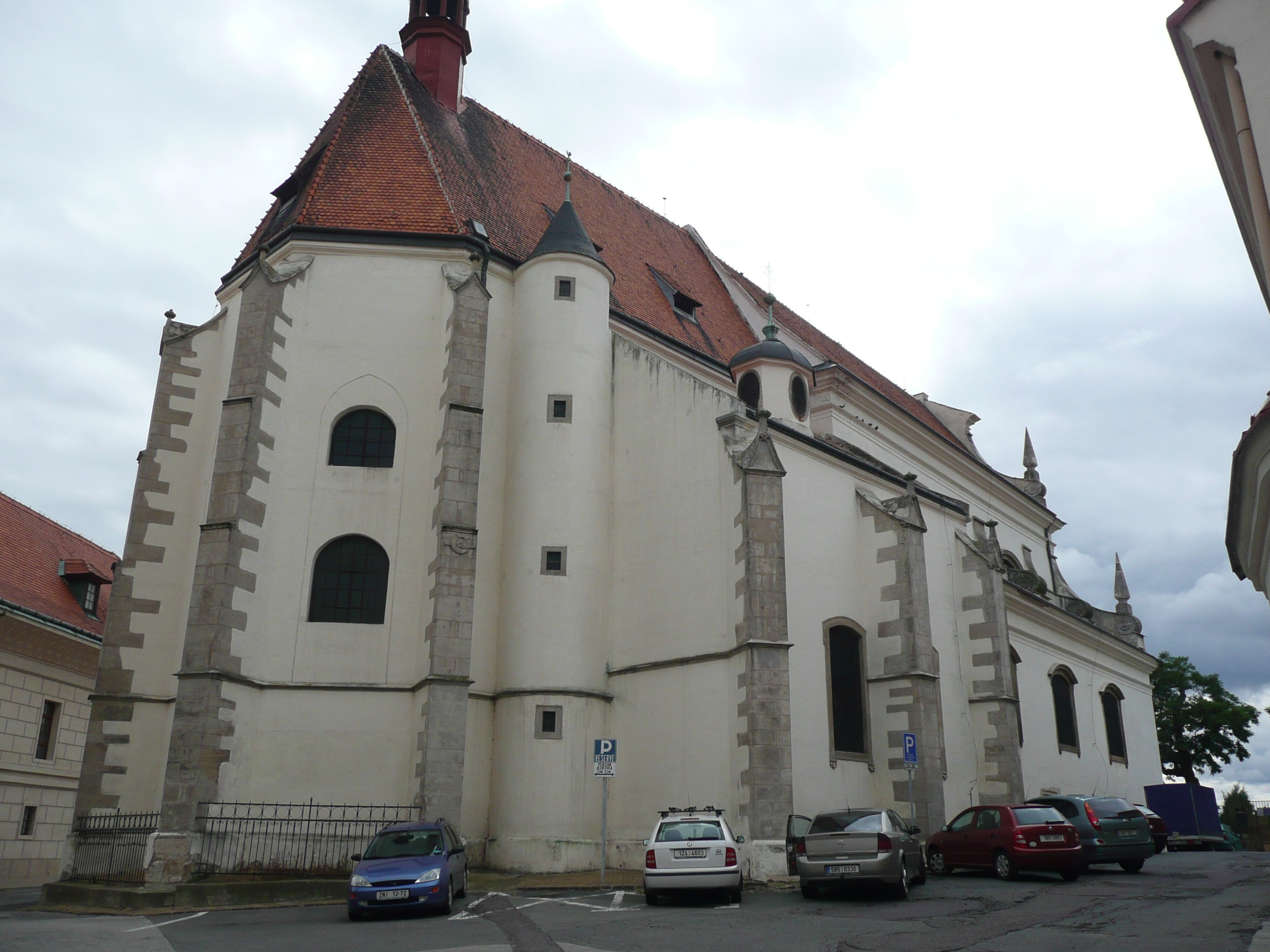
Rear part of the church

Church of Saint Michael the Archangel (Czech: Kostel svatého Michala) is a church in Znojmo in the South Moravian Region of the Czech Republic.

== History ==
The first written mention of the church is from 1226. The original church was probably built in the 12th century for the newcomers who were settling around Znojmo Castle. It is the second most significant church in the town after Church of Saint Nicholas. The church was built at the highest point in Znojmo and consecrated to Saint Michael the Archangel which suggest that it could have replaced an ancient pagan worship place.

The church was built in the Romanesque style and completely rebuilt in the late Gothic style in 1508.

In the 16th century it came under the power of the Lutheran preachers, at that time the church tower collapsed for the first time (1581). The Jesuits took over the ravaged place in 1624 and proceeded to rebuild it. The church tower collapsed for the second time in 1642 and was not to be rebuilt again as part of the church structure.

In 1694 a new bell tower was constructed separately from the church (the so-called campanile).
