= Vasile Vasilenco =

Ion Vasilenco
- Born: 20 January 1926; Pașcani, Kingdom of Romania
- Died: 13 March 1977 (aged 51); Chișinău, Moldavian SSR
- Resting place: Chișinău
- Education: Moldova State University

Ion Vasilenco (20 January 1926 in Pașcani – 13 March 1977 in Chișinău) was a literary critic from Moldova.

He graduated from Moldova State University in 1951 and got his PhD in 1956. He was one of the most influential literary critic in Moldavian SSR.

== Works ==
- Opere alese (1955)
- Izbrannoe (1959)
- Studies on Constantin Stere, Andrei Lupan, Emilian Bukov, George Meniuc
- Istoria literaturii moldovenești (Vol.1, 1958)
- Schiță asupra istoriei literaturii sovietice moldovenești(1963)
- Din trecutul cultural și literar al poporului moldovenesc(1969)

== Bibliography ==
- Literatura și arta Moldovei Encicl., Vol. 1, Chișinău, 1985
- Chișinău-enciclopedie, 1997
