= Rotunda of Saint Catherine =

Coordinates: 48°51′20″N 16°02′37″E

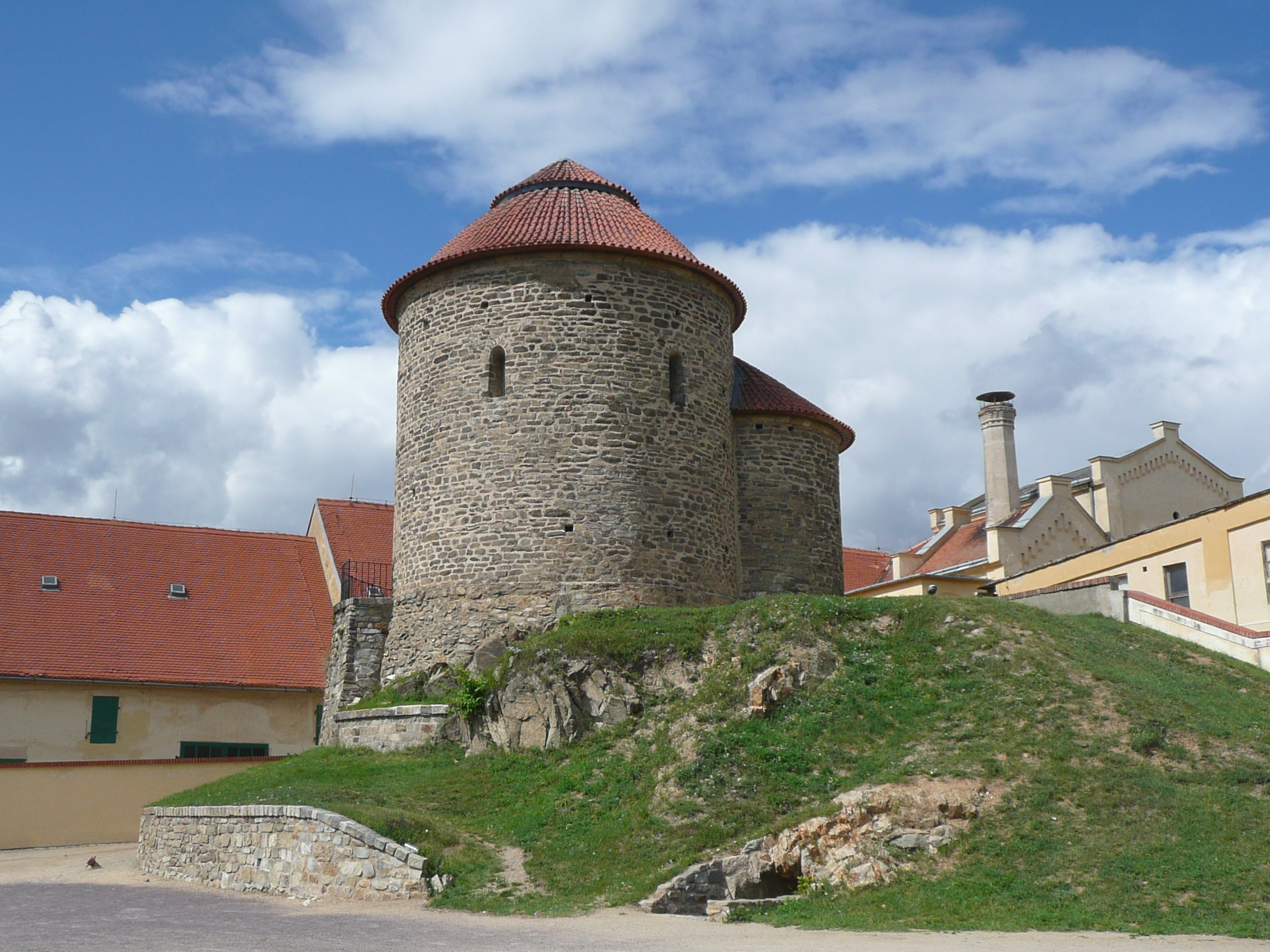
Rotunda of St. Catherine

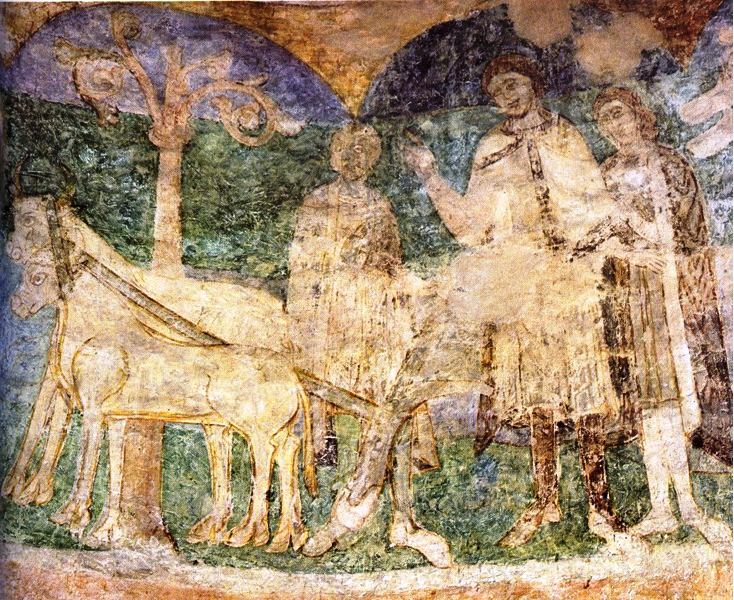
Part of the fresco in the Rotunda of St. Catherine (Přemysl the Ploughman)

The Rotunda of St. Catherine (Czech: Rotunda sv. Kateřiny), known as the Znojmo Rotunda (Znojemská rotunda), is a Romanesque rotunda located in Znojmo, Czech Republic. It is the town's most valuable monument, and features one of the oldest fresco compositions in the Czech lands. Besides the religious motives, of particular importance is the praising portrayal of the ruling Přemyslid dynasty.

The building was originally a castle chapel, dedicated to Virgin Mary, built in the mid-11th century. The painting was commissioned by Konrad II of Znojmo on the occasion of his wedding with Mary (Marija), daughter of Uroš I of Serbia in 1134. Apart from the donor couple, Konrad and Mary, the identity of the other depicted members of the dynasty is disputed among the historians. With two exceptions being the Přemysl the Ploughman, the legendary ancestor of the dynasty, and Vratislaus I, the first King of Bohemia.

== Sources ==
- Pavel Ciprian (1997). Znojemská rotunda ve světle vědeckého poznání: vědecká konference, Znojmo 23.- 25. 9. 1996; sborník příspěvků. Jihomoravské Muzeum. ISBN 978-80-902383-1-2.
- Barbara Krzemieńská; Anežka Merhautová; Dušan Třeštík (2000). Moravští Přemyslovci ve znojemské rotundě. Set Out. ISBN 978-80-86277-09-7.
- Znojemská rotunda: malby v národní kulturní památce Rotunda sv. Kateřiny a výsledky současného výzkumu : sborník z 2. konference o rotundě, konané 25.-26. června 2003 ve Znojmě. Město Znojmo, odbor školství a kultury. 2004. ISBN 978-80-85064-20-9.
