= Church of the Holy Archangels, Târgu Jiu =

Heritage site in Gorj County, Romania

Coordinates: 45.0410°N 23.2723°E

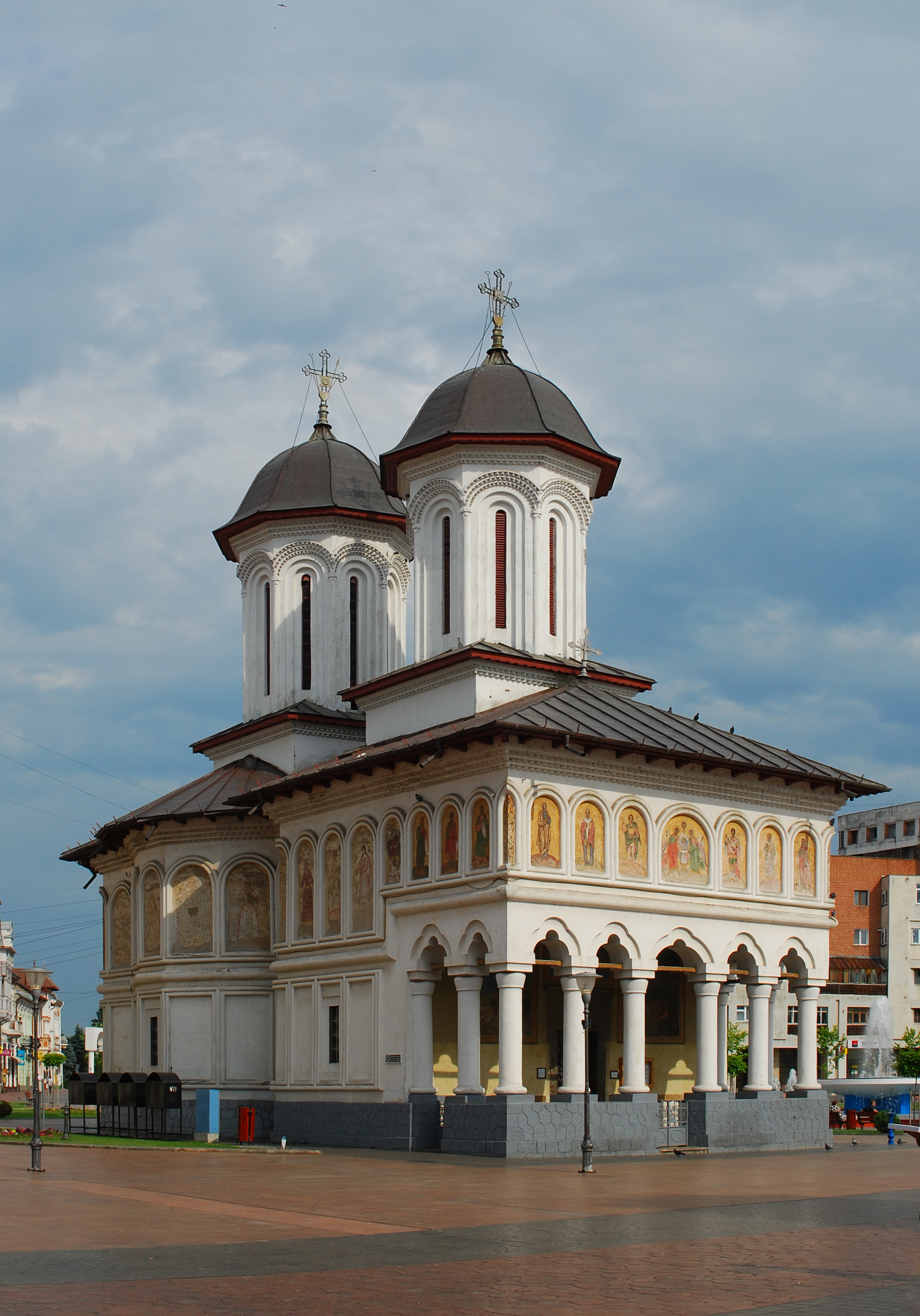
Church of the Holy Archangels

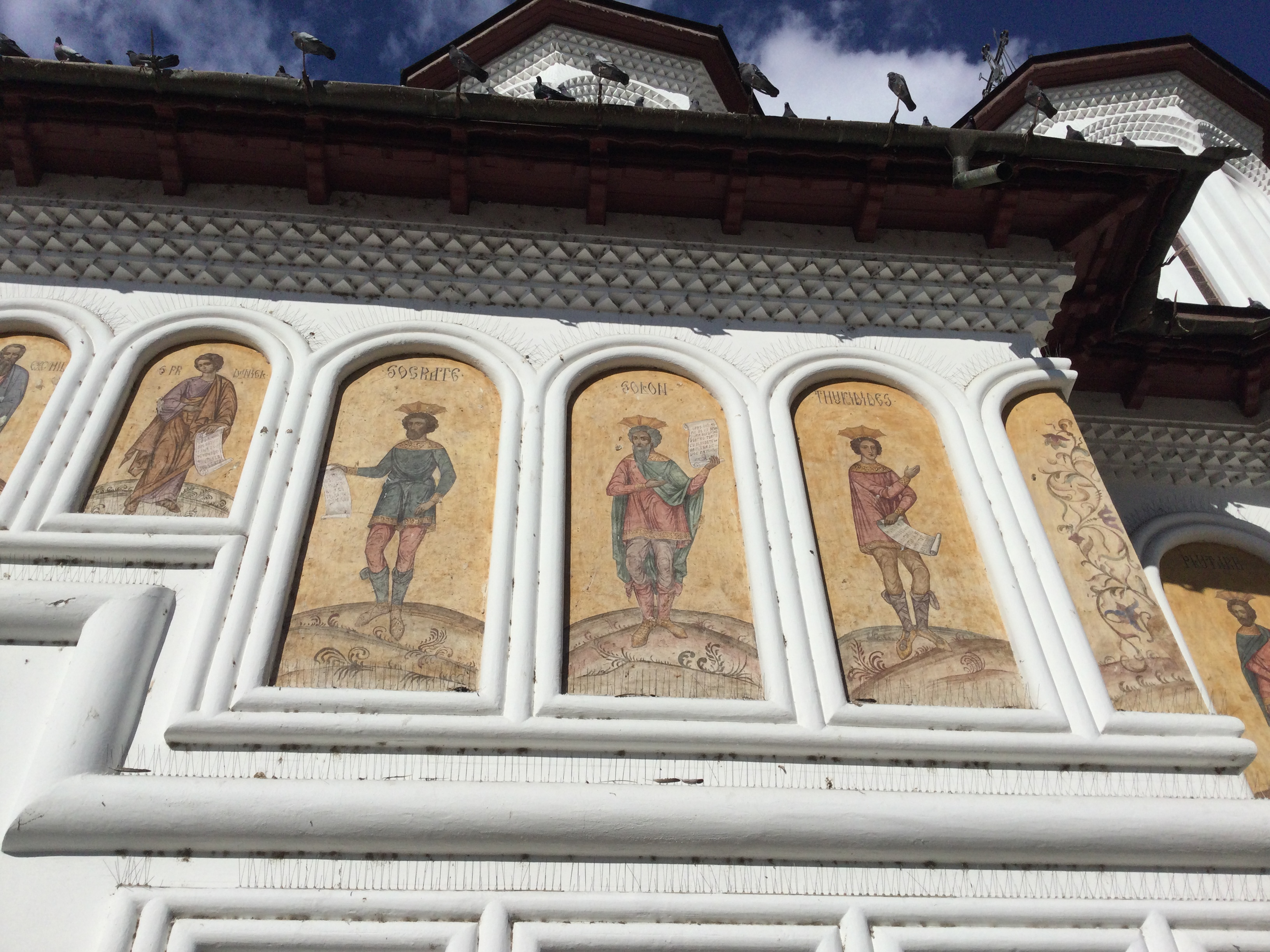
Panels depicting Socrates, Solon and Thucydides

The Church of the Holy Archangels (Romanian: Biserica Sfinții Voievozi) is a Romanian Orthodox church located on Piața Victoriei, Târgu Jiu, Romania. It is dedicated to the Archangels Michael and Gabriel.

The ktetors were the merchants Dobre Sîrbu and Radu Cupetu, whose portraits appear in the vestibule; it is sometimes known as the Merchants’ Church. The cruciform church was built between 1748 and 1764. The church suffered damage during the Russo-Austro-Turkish wars. It was repaired by Wallachian princes Alexander Mourouzis in 1793 and by John Caradja in 1813. For a time, a princely school operated in rooms near the church.

The church was initially painted in Byzantine style fresco during the 18th century. In 1843, the iconostasis was painted with support from Pavel Kiselyov. In 1854–1855, the frescoes were painted over in Renaissance style by Mișu Popp, while the spires were lengthened. Repairs, especially of the exterior, took place in 1902 and in 1933–1940.

Historian Nicolae Iorga was involved in the latter restoration, suggesting that the spire extensions be removed, the windows narrowed, the facade ledges brought back. The interior paintings were cleaned, while the old exterior frescoes, featuring philosophers and sibyls, were redone by local painter Iosif Keber. Among the figures depicted are Socrates, Aristotle, Pythagoras, Diogenes, Hippocrates and Plutarch. Such subjects are virtually unique for churches in Romania.

During the Communist regime, the church stood in front of the local Romanian Communist Party headquarters. As such, it was targeted for demolition, but was saved by vigorous protests from experts. Nevertheless, the church was shut down in 1960 and became a museum in the early 1980s. It reopened as a church on Christmas Eve of 1989, during the Romanian Revolution; further repairs followed. Excavations around the foundation have revealed human bones, suggesting the presence of a cemetery in the past.

The church is listed as a historic monument by Romania's Ministry of Culture and Religious Affairs.
