= Church of the Holy Archangels, Vagharshapat =

Church in Armavir, Armenia

Coordinates: 40°09′45″N 44°17′36″E

Church of the Holy Archangels Սրբոց Հրեշտակապետաց եկեղեցի
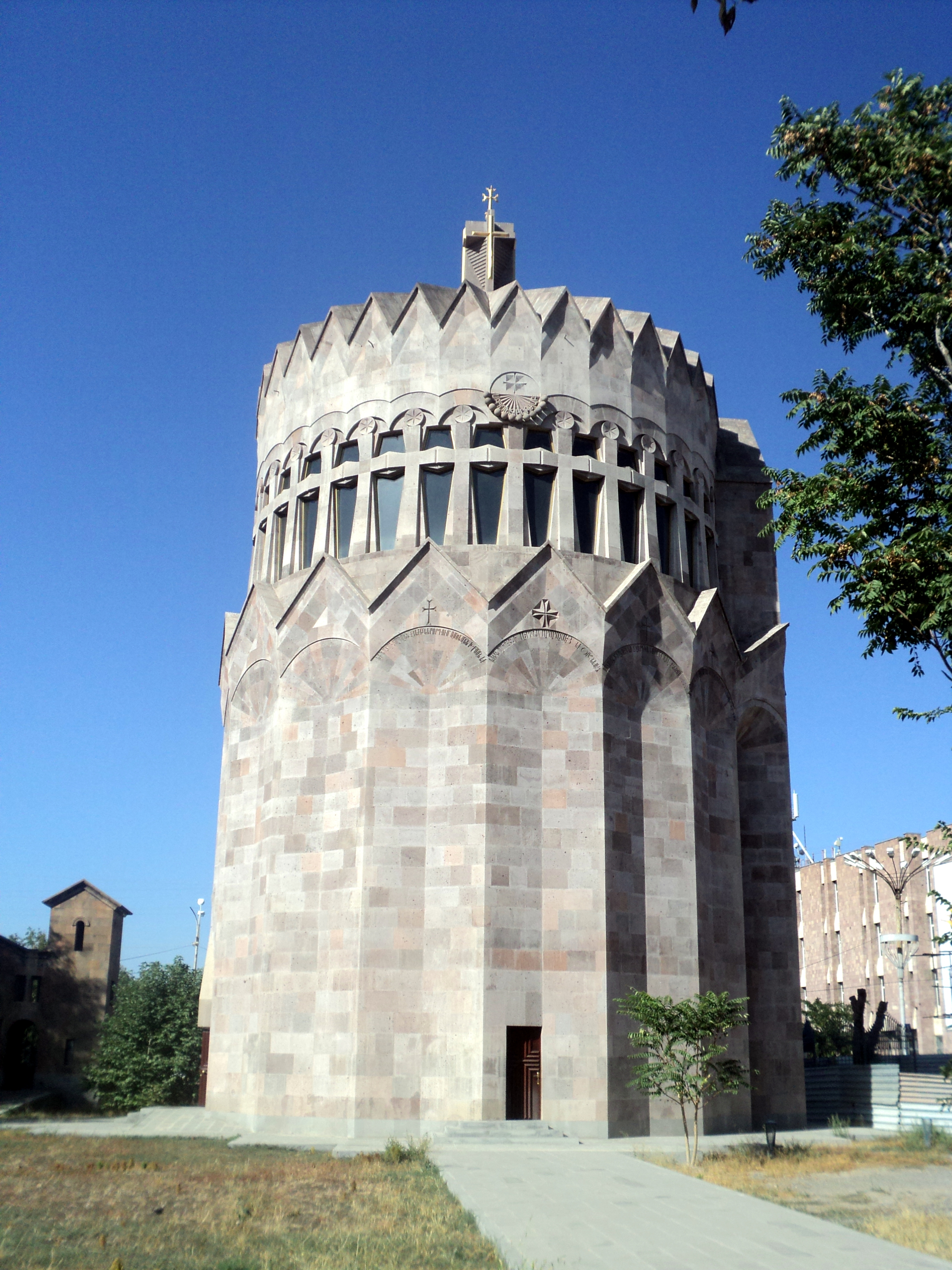

- Location within Armenia

Religion
- Affiliation: Armenian Apostolic Church

Location
- Location: Vagharshapat, Armavir Province, Armenia

Architecture
- Architect: Jim Torosyan
- Type: Circular
- Style: Armenian
- Groundbreaking: 10 September 2007
- Completed: 5 November 2011

Specifications
- Width: 15 m (49 ft)
- Dome: 1

The Church of the Holy Archangels (Armenian: Սրբոց Հրեշտակապետաց եկեղեցի) is a church located in the town of Vagharshapat, Armenia, within the complex of the Mother See of Holy Etchmiadzin, adjacent to the Gevorkian Theological Seminary.

== History and architecture ==
The construction of the church was launched in September 2007 by the donation of benefactor Gagik Galstyan and with the design of architect Jim Torosyan. It has a circular shape with a diameter of 15 meters.

It occupies the northeastern corner of the Mother See complex, the area between the Gevorkian Seminary and the Gate of Vazgen I.

The consecration of the church took place on 5 November 2011 by Catholicos Karekin II. The church is mainly used by the deacons and students of the seminary to hold their daily liturgical services and divine worship. However, the church is open for secular worshipers as well.

== Gallery ==
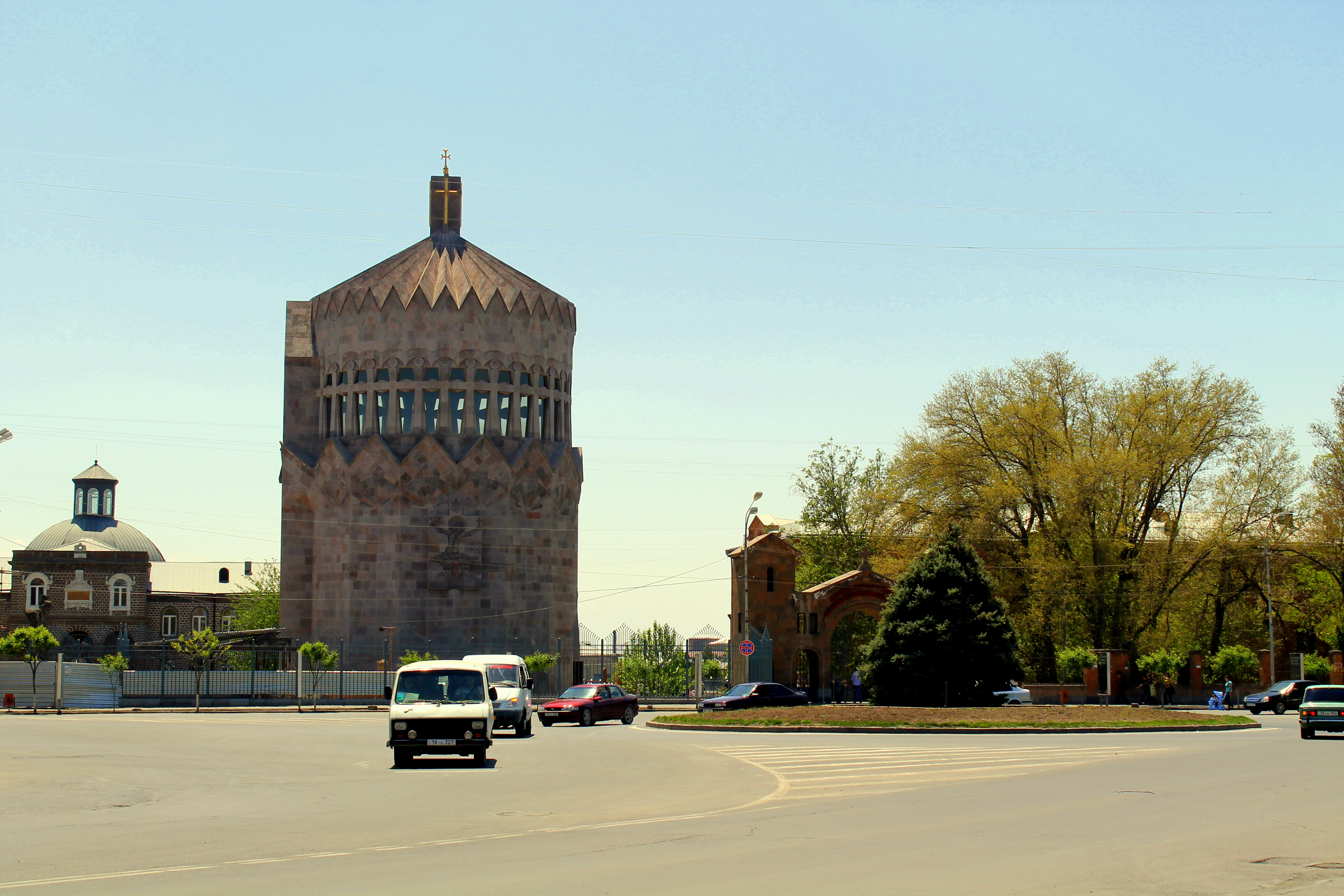
The church as seen between the Gevorkian Seminary and the Gate of Vazgen I

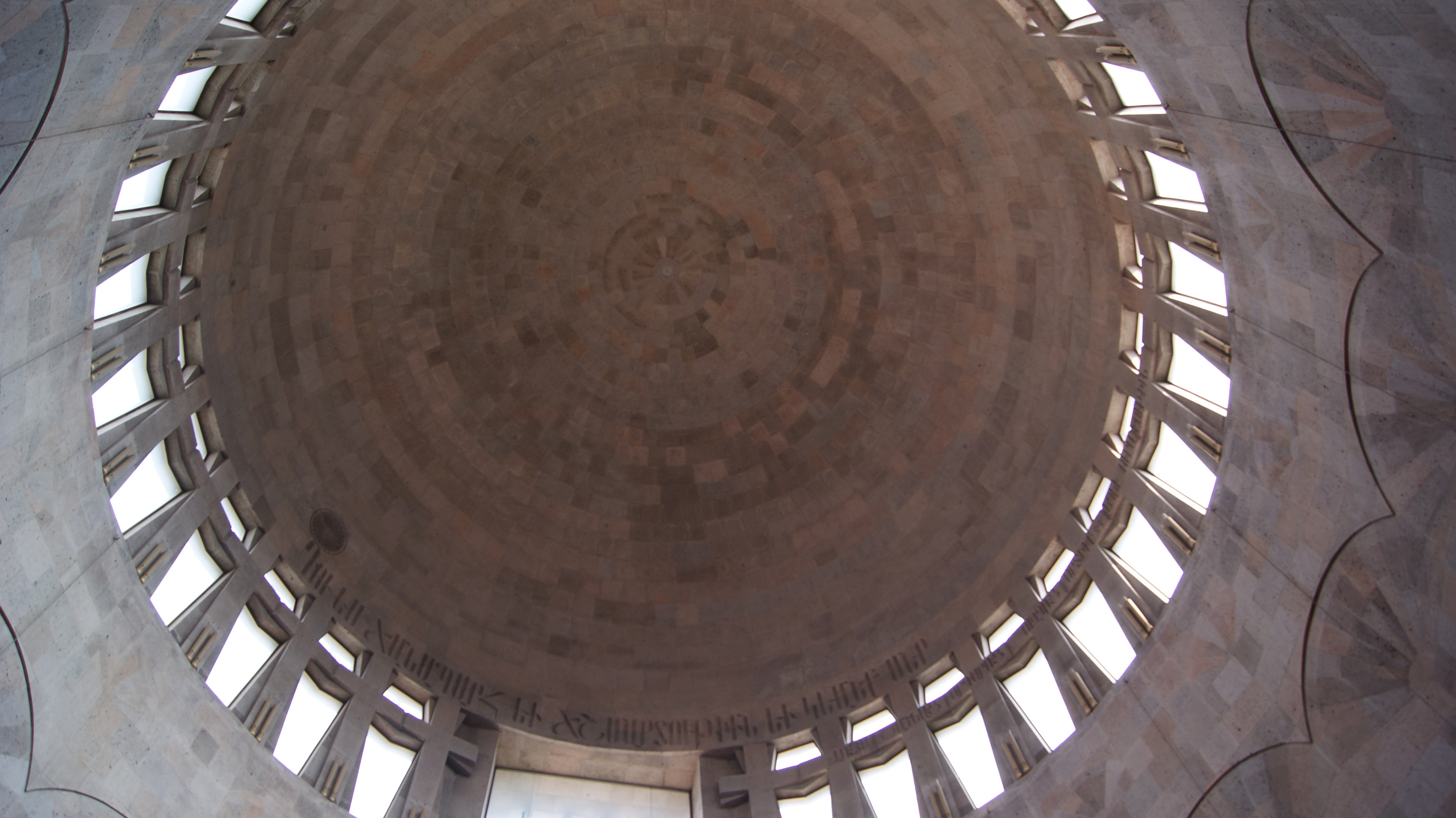
Internal view of the dome

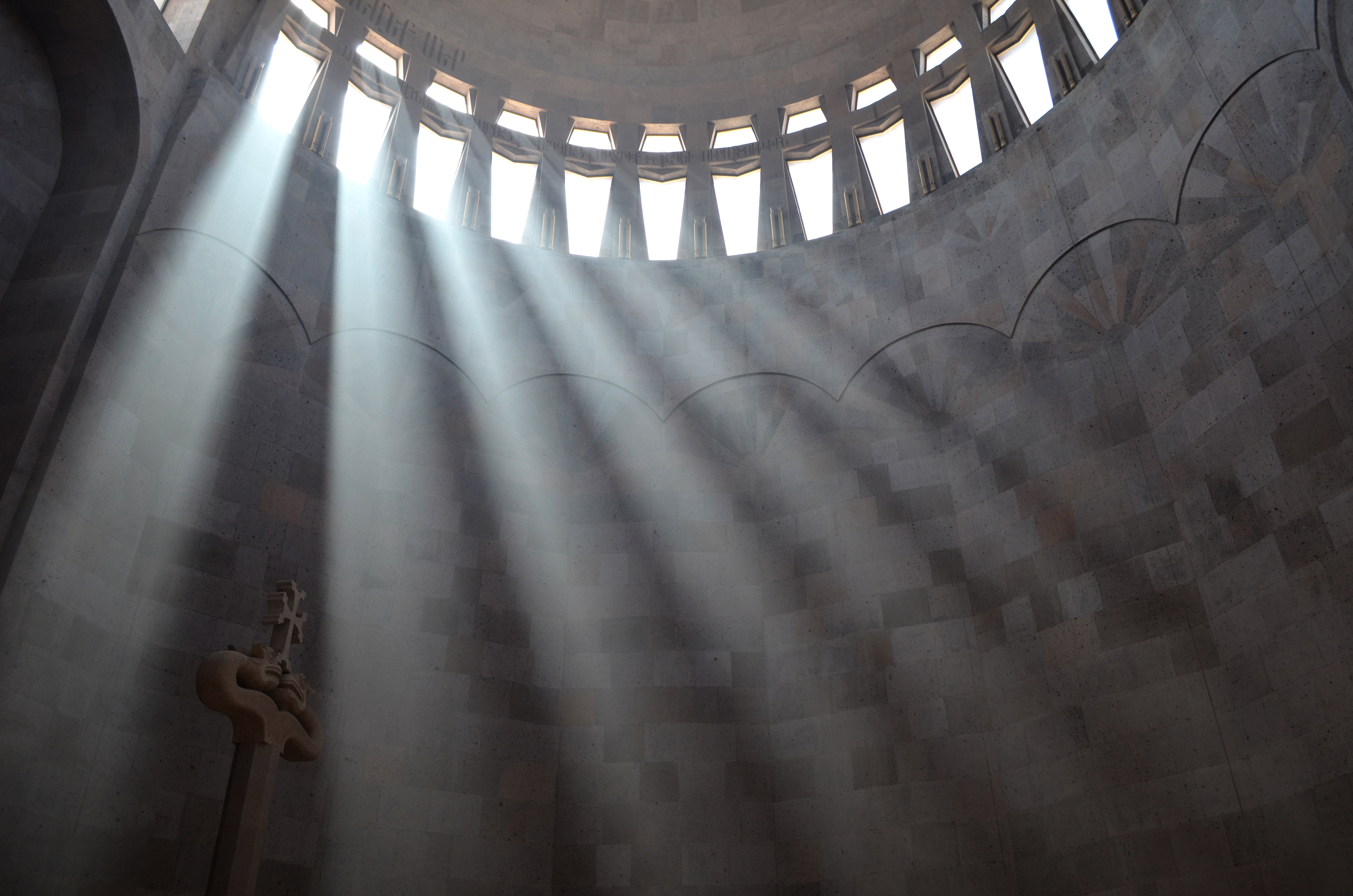
Inside the church

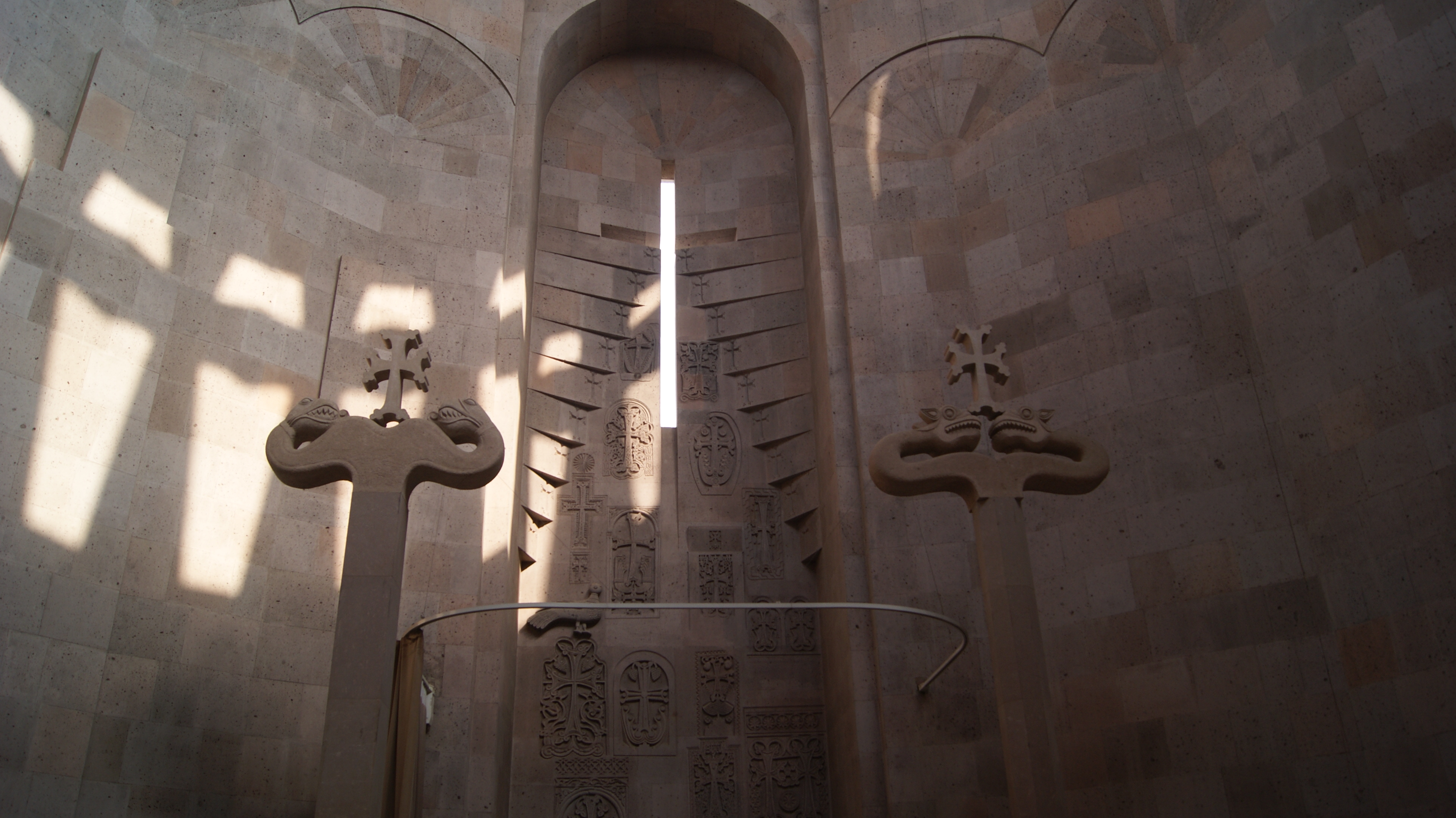
The altar

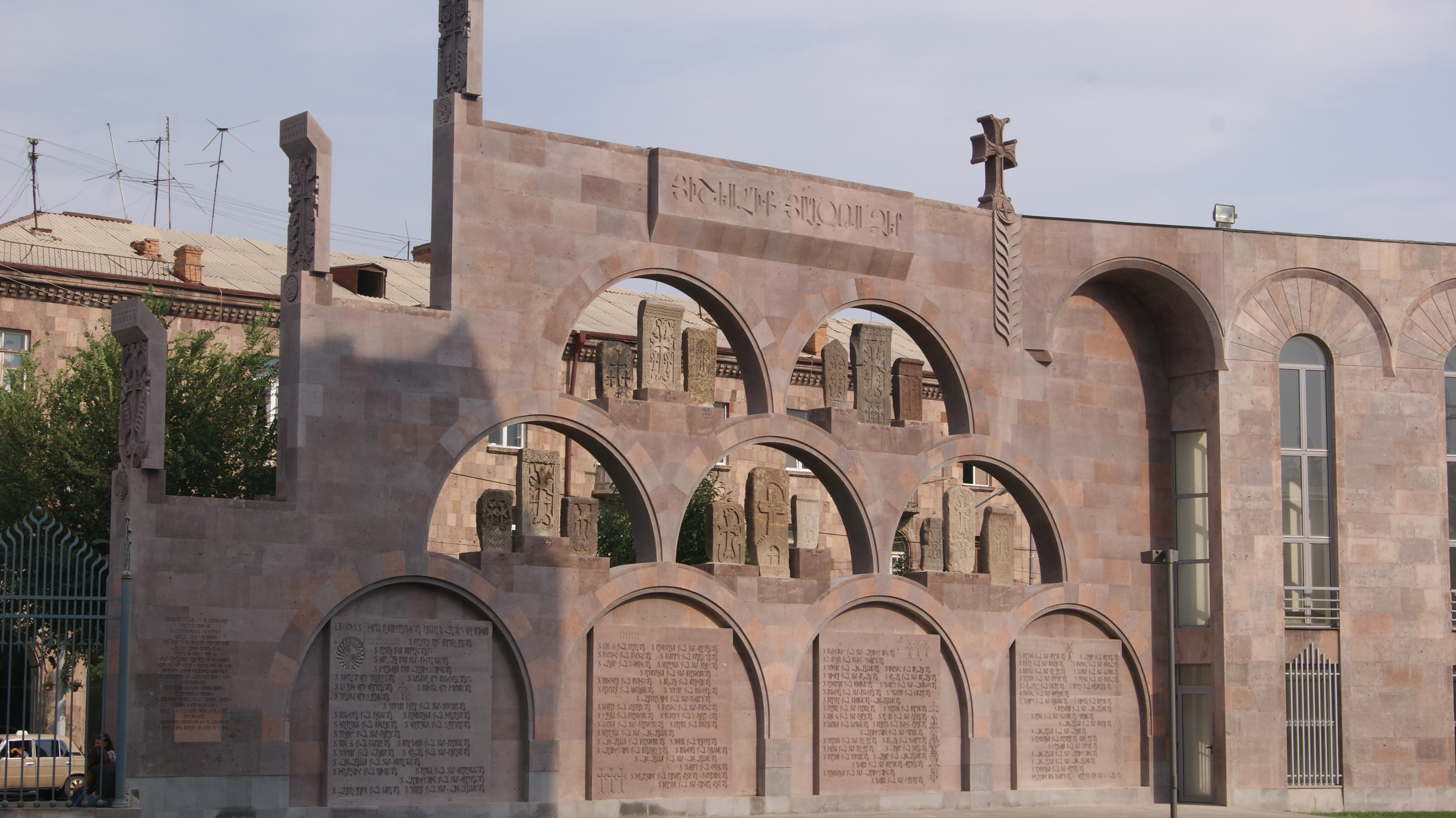
At the church yard
