= Church of the Holy Archangel Michael, Kokshetau =

Church of the Holy Archangel Michael in Kokshetau
- Архангел Михаил ғибадатханасы (Kazakh); Михаило-Архангельский собор (Russian)
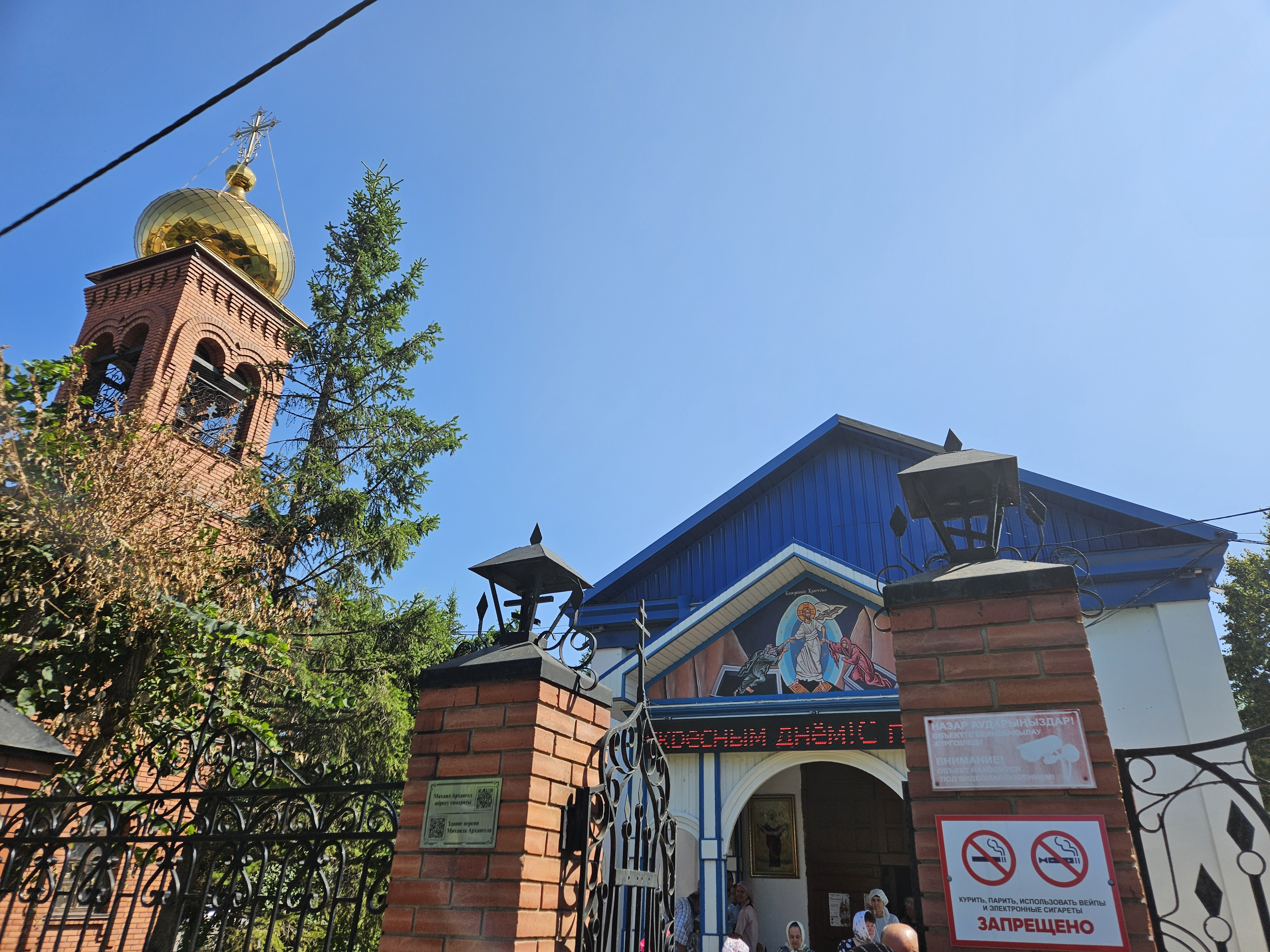
- View of the Archangel Michael Cathedral
- Church of the Holy Archangel Michael in Kokshetau
- 53°16′24″N 69°22′53″E
- Location: Shokan Valikhanov Street, 68 (020000), Kokshetau
- Country: Kazakhstan
- Denomination: Russian Orthodox
- Website: www.pravest-kokshe.kz

History
- Status: Parish church
- Dedication: Michael (archangel)
- Consecrated: 6 June 1896

Architecture
- Architectural type: Church building
- Style: Russian architecture
- Completed: 1949

The Church of the Holy Archangel Michael (Kazakh: Михаил-Архангел ғибадатханасы, romanized: Mihail-Arhangel ğibadathanasy; Russian: Михаило-Архангельский собор, romanized: Mikhailo-Arkhangelskiy sobor) is a Russian Orthodox cathedral located in Kokshetau, the capital of Akmola Region in the northern part of Kazakhstan. It is an architectural and cultural landmark of Kokshetau.

The existing structure, built in 1949, is a relocated version of the temple of the same name, previously located in the central city park of Kokshetau and dismantled in 1949. It is dedicated to the Archangel Michael and is located at Valikhanov Street, 68 (formerly Yuzhnaya Street); 020000. The church is built in the Russian architecture style.

It is an architectural monument of local importance.

== History ==
=== Foundation–late 19th century ===
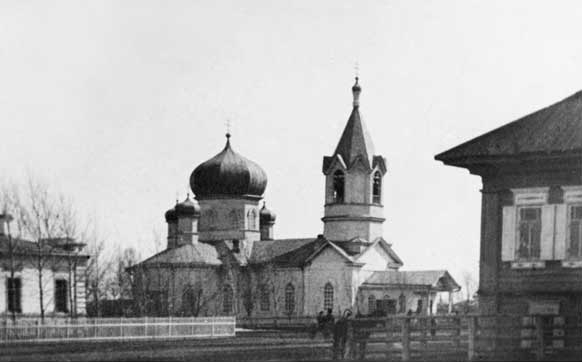
Temple of the Archangel Michael, 1920

The first wooden church in the name of Saint Archangel Michael was built in 1895 on the territory of the Central City Garden Kokshetau.

The townspeople turned to the bishop Omsk and Semipalatinsk Grigory (Poletaev), who consecrated the church on June 6, 1896.

The street leading to it became known as Mikhailo-Arkhangelskaya (Russian: улица Михаило-Архангельская). Parish trusteeship was opened in 1900.

During Easter week, clergy visited all the houses of the parishioners with the holy cross, after that they conducted a tour with holy icons around the houses of the parish.

=== The Revolution and the closure of the temple ===
2 February 1918: the Council of People's Commissars adopted a decree on the separation of the state and the school from the church.

5 April 1923: a transfer of property in connection with the separation of church from state and school from church. Rector-priest John Maslov.

In April 1923, audits were carried out and inventories were drawn up St. George and the Archangel Michael churches, the number of icons, candlesticks, bells, vestments were counted. Everything described on receipt was handed over to the priests and church leaders.

December 1937: the authorities attempted to take the Church of Archangel Michael from the community.

6 April 1939: and at the general meeting of the religious society of the city Kokchetav, it was decided “to transfer the Mikhailovskaya Church to the disposal of the City Council with all church property”.

At an extraordinary meeting of the Presidium of the City Council from 20 April 1939, a decision was made to rebuild the temple into a city club. The believers asked the City Executive Committee for permission to hold services in the Church of the Archangel Michael at least until 10 May 1939) so that they could put in order St. George Church, the petition also indicated a request to register the priest Nikolai Vasilyevich Obododovsky for serving in the church.

30 December 1939: "in order to improve the well-being of the working people of the city", an estimate for the improvement of the city of Kokchetav was approved for 1940. Number 1 in the estimate indicated "the re-equipment of the church into a city club - 82,600 rubles."

10 April 1940: by the decision of the City Council the transfer of the building of the Archangel Michael Church to a club in the department of the martel for a period of 15 years.

From 1940 to 1947, with a stage set up in place of the altar, the Church of the Archangel Michael was a city club.

=== Return to believers: dismantling and transfer of the church (1947–1949) ===
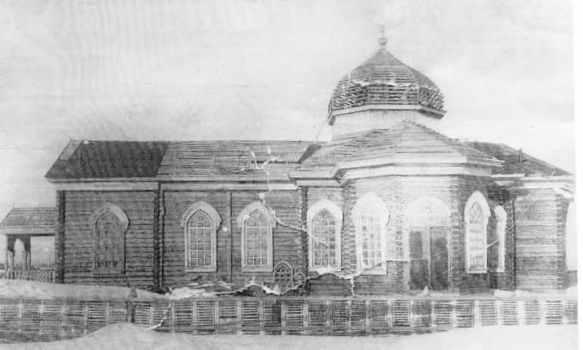
Temple of the Archangel Michael on Valikhanov Street after relocation, 1949

In 1947, the church building, cut from logs, was dismantled and moved to a vacant lot along the current street named after Valikhanov thanks to the intervention of the archbishop Alma-Ata Nikolai (Mogilevsky), who sent a telegram to Moscow to Council for the Russian Orthodox church demanding the return of the temple to the believers.

3 June 1949, the beginning of the construction of the Church of the Archangel Michael in a new place. On September 12, the building of the Church of the Archangel Michael, erected on a new site by the efforts of the parishioners, was taken into operation. Priest - Matvey Rakov.

In November 1949, consecration of the newly built temple. Despite an attempt by the authorities the following year to terminate the agreement with the community and abolish the parish, the church was not closed. On 24 November, Alexander Igumnov was registered as a priest of the Church of the Archangel Michael. 15 February 1950 - agreement on the transfer of the church building to believers.

On 12 May 1950, the church was closed. Priest Maxim Lomakin petitioned the authorities to open the church and resume the services.

On 7 February 1954, the re-election of the church council and the audit commission was held. The rector is Maxim Lomakin.

On 1 June 1956, Joseph (Chernov), previously the head of Kazakhstan Metropolitan District, was appointed the rector of the temple.

From 1973 to 1975, Ambrose Shulgai, appointed by Metropolitan Joseph, served as priest in the church. On 27 January 1975, Archpriest Viktor Golubev was appointed to serve.

On 2 January 1987, the bishop Alma-Ata and Kazakhstan Eusebius (Savvin) appointed Archpriest Vasily Kachankin as rector of the church. In 1989, Archpriest Ambrose Shulgai was reappointed to the staff of the temple by Bishop Eusebius (Savin).

In 2011, St. Michael's Church became Cathedral Kokshetau and Akmola dioceses.

As of May 2014, the following serve in the Church of the Archangel Michael: the rector of the church, Archpriest Vasily Kachankin, Archpriest Konstantin Kopnin, Priest Alexander Vasilenko, Priest Andrei Savvateev, Deacon Yevgeny Shelobodin.

The parish has a baptismal building, a Sunday school and prosphora building, a brick bell tower, a residential building, and a refectory. Total area 250 sq. m.

== Shrines of the Temple ==
In the Cathedral of the Holy Archangel Michael there are icons painted on the holy Mount Athos:

- the icon of the Theotokos "Quick to Hear" (written in the late 19th - early 20th centuries);
- the icon of the Mother of God "Axion Estin" (written in 1911);
- the icon of the great martyr and wonderworker Panteleimon (written at the end of the 19th century).

== See also ==
- St George's Church, Kokshetau
- Eastern Orthodoxy in Kazakhstan
