= Church of the Holy Archangels, Focșani =

Heritage site in Vrancea County, Romania

Coordinates: 45°41′54″N 27°10′19″E

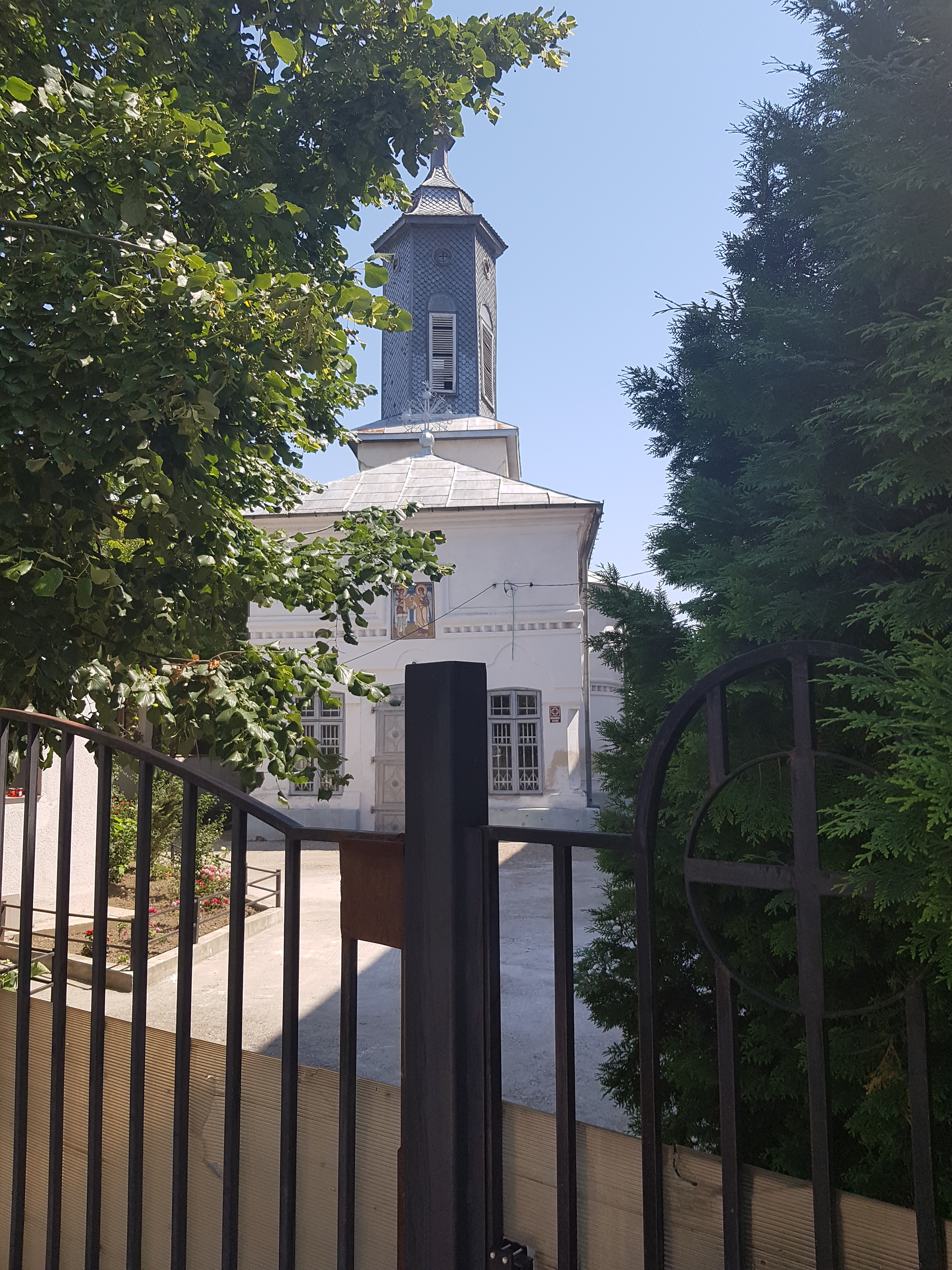
Church of the Holy Archangels

The Church of the Holy Archangels (Romanian: Biserica Sfinții Voievozi) is a Romanian Orthodox church located at 7 Garofiței Street in Focșani, Romania. It is dedicated to the Archangels Michael and Gabriel.

The church was built between 1744 and 1746. It is listed as a historic monument by Romania's Ministry of Culture and Religious Affairs.
