= Churches of the Holy Archangels, Carei =

Greek-Catholic and Romanian Orthodox churches in Romania

Coordinates: 47°41′15″N 22°28′03″E

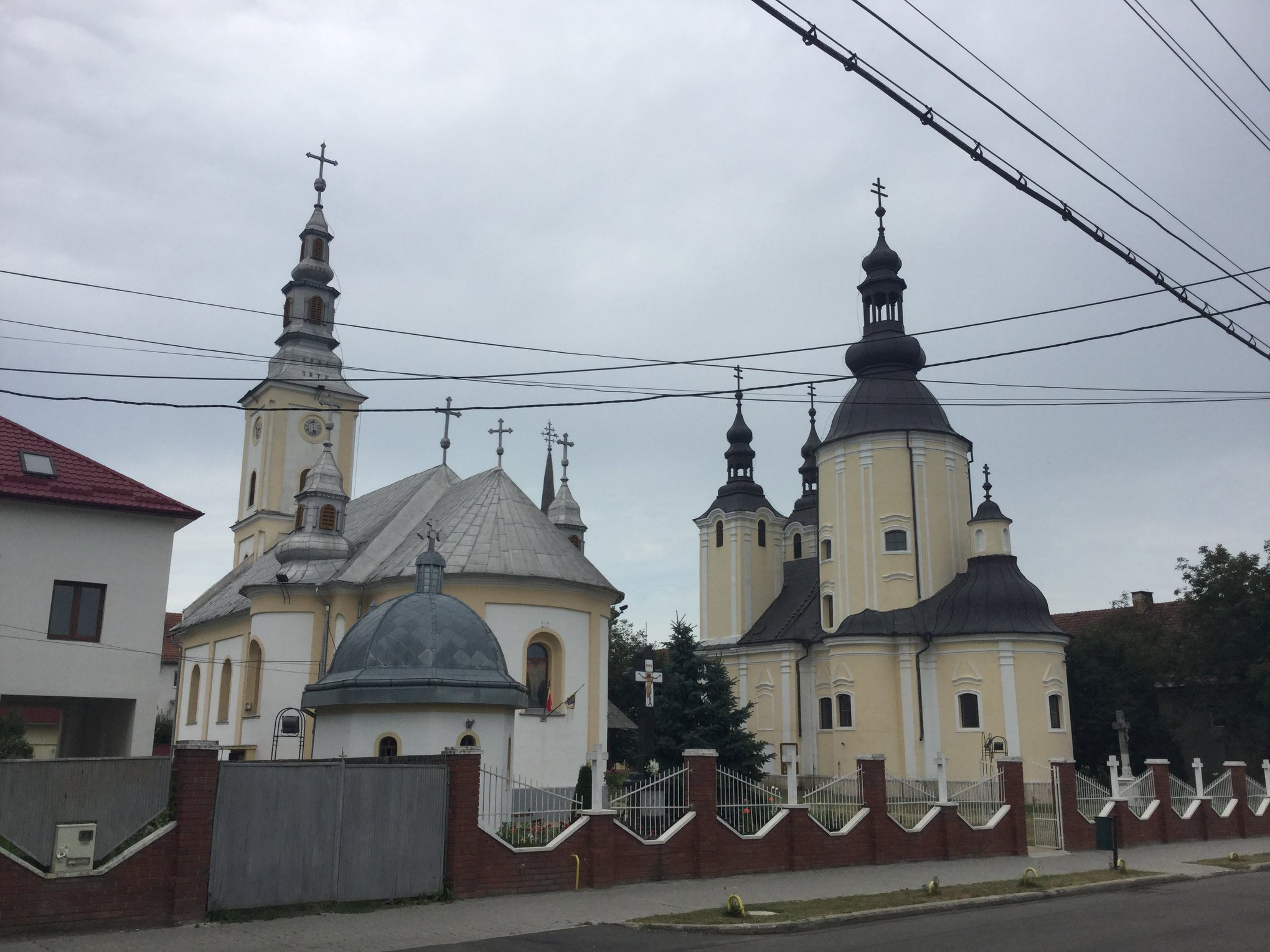
Churches of the Holy Archangels

The Churches of the Holy Archangels (Romanian: Bisericile Sfinții Arhangheli Mihail și Gavril) are a pair of adjoining churches located in the same yard on Doina Street, Carei, Romania. They are dedicated to the Archangels Michael and Gabriel.

== Orthodox church ==
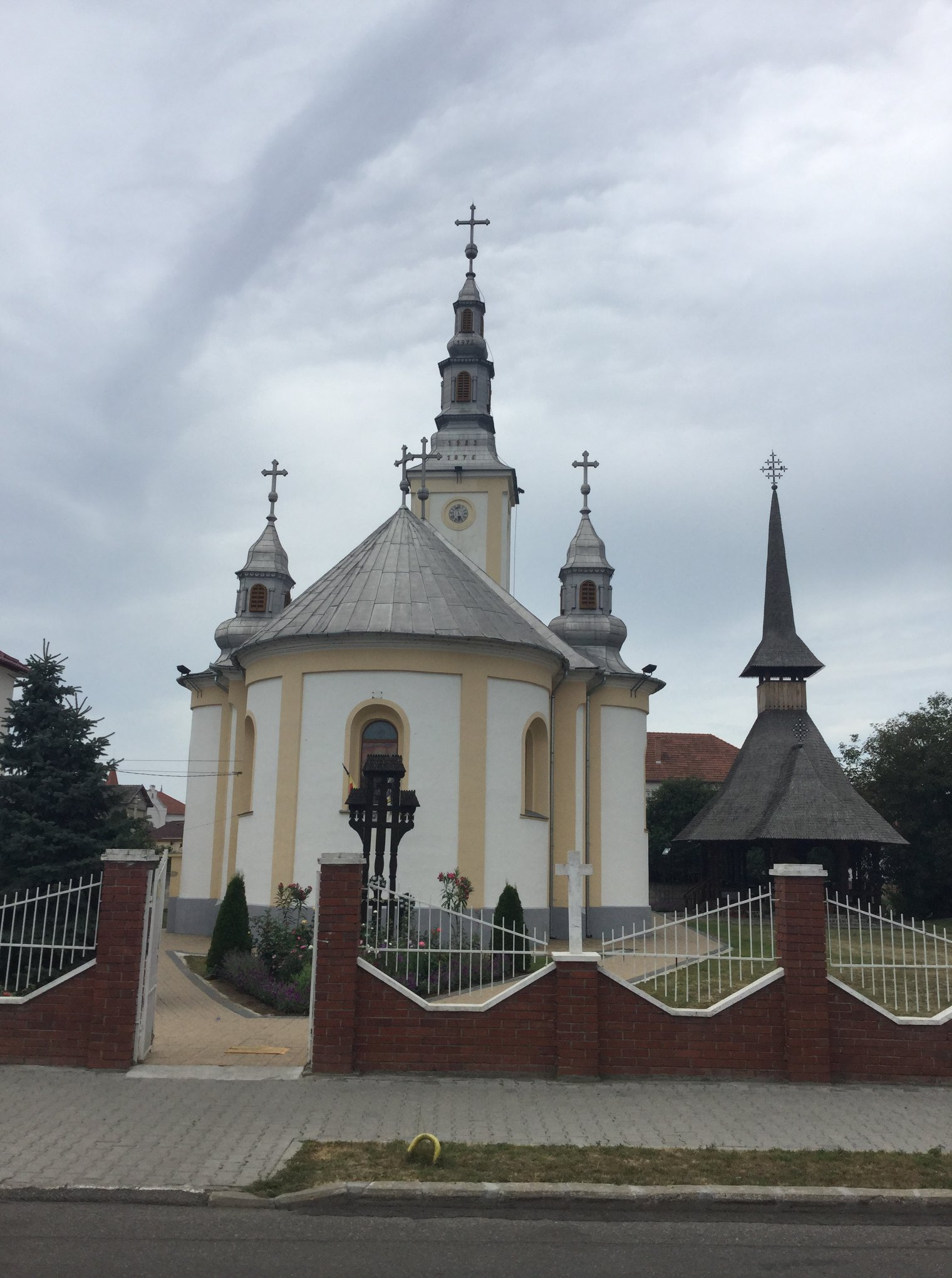
Orthodox church

The church located at #11 is Romanian Orthodox. Built by the Romanian Greek-Catholic community in 1752, it was seriously damaged by an 1834 earthquake, then repaired. Further renovations took place in 1876 and 1906. In 1923–1925, the wood roof shingles were replaced by sheeting, and the building electrified. In 1948, the new communist regime banned the Greek-Catholic Church and transferred the property to the Orthodox Church. The interior walls were painted in 1965. Stained glass was added in 1980, and in 1983, the roof and iconostasis were repaired.

The provincial Baroque church lies along an east–west line; it is composed of a vestibule with a spire, a long rectangular nave and an altar with a semicircular apse. There are side apses where the nave joins the altar. The facades are simple. The main entrance is enclosed in a stone semicircle and flanked by half columns. The large Baroque iconostasis has several levels of Byzantine icons. The royal doors are decorated with leaves and roses.

== Greek-Catholic church ==
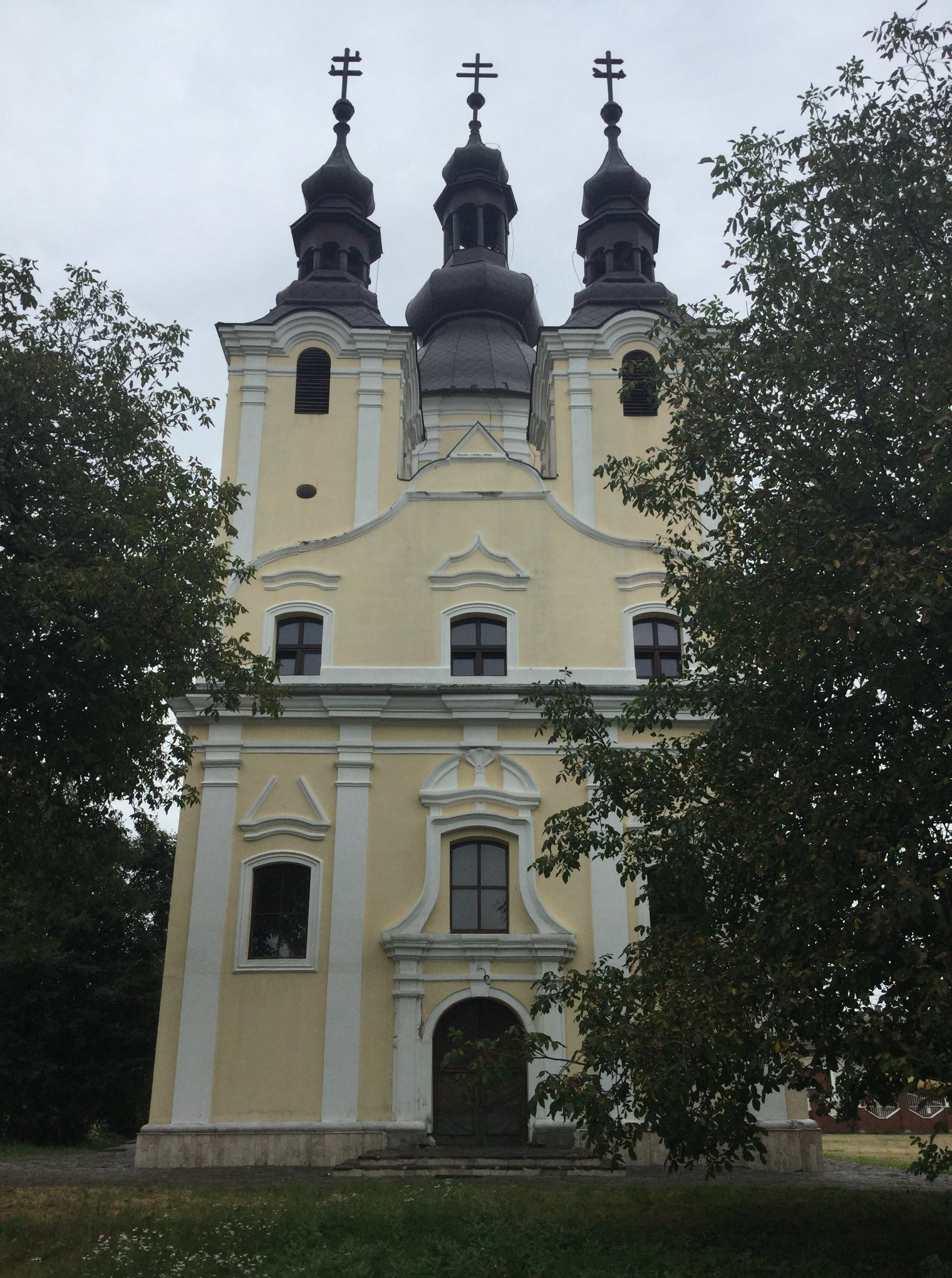
Greek-Catholic church

The church located at #13 is Greek-Catholic. The town's first inhabitants of that denomination were hajduks who settled there in the late 17th century, guarding the fortress on behalf of the Károlyi family. In the early 18th century, Sándor Károlyi assigned an area for the hajduks to settle; later, Romanian families from surrounding villages noticeably increased the Greek-Catholic population. The community first built a wooden church in the 1720s, and another in 1736. As the Romanian and Ruthene parishioners disagreed over joint usage, the latter built a new church in 1737–1739. The Ruthenes continued to attend the wooden church until the stone building was completed.

One of Carei's earliest Baroque buildings, the church is believed to be inspired by the one in Máriapócs, Hungary. It was seriously damaged by the 1834 earthquake, but soon repaired. New repairs took place in 1888; the ambon and altar likely date to that time. The main dome was painted, and window niches installed. Further renovations took place in 1967 and 1973. A large cross was placed in the yard in 1894.

The brick church has a single nave, with two spires on the western end and a trefoil altar at the east. The massive central dome has a bulbous extension. The entrance portal is semicircular. The main facade is lightly decorated with shell motifs; the side facades feature windows in similar patterns to the main one. The nave has a vaulted, semi-cylindrical ceiling; along with the side walls, it is decorated with stucco flowers. The richly ornamented iconostasis has 19 icons and dates to 1857. The altar painting, depicting the Ascension of Jesus, copies the Satu Mare Cathedral. The 1888 dome painting depicts scenes in the Virgin Mary's life. Today, the congregation is Hungarian, and the church is known as Szent Mihály és Gábor arkangyalok görög-katolikus templom in their language.

Both churches are listed as historic monuments by Romania's Ministry of Culture and Religious Affairs.
