= St. Michael the Archangel's Church, Novopyshminskoye =

Orthodox Church Made of Wood

St. Michael the Archangel's Church
- Церковь Архангела Михаила
- Interactive map of the St. Michael the Archangel's Church area

General information
- Location: Novopyshminskoye
- Coordinates: 56°52′52″N 62°13′57″E

St. Michael the Archangel's Church is an Orthodox church in Novopyshminskoye village, Sverdlovsk oblast.

The building was granted the status of regional significance on 31 December 1987 (decision No. 535 by the executive committee of Sverdlovsk oblast Council of People's Deputies). The object number of cultural heritage of regional significance is 661720975770005.

== History ==
The construction date of the first wooden church building is the end of the 17th century. The second wooden church was laid in 1786. The construction of the stone building began in 1796. In 1810 the side-altar was consecrated in honor of the St. Paraskeva. In 1822 the main church was consecrated in honor of St. Michael the Archangel. Around the church a stone fence with an iron grid was built in 1864.

The clergy of the parish consists of a priest, a deacon and a psalm-reader. The chapel in Zaimka village and the chapel in Melnichnaya village were included in the parish.

In 1934 the chimes were banned. The church was closed on 9 July 1935(the decree of the Presidium of the Regional Executive Committee No. 1629).

In 1941 the evacuated children from the Orphanage No. 14 (from the Bucha railway station;the suburbs of Kyiv) stayed in the buildings of the church. Since 1935 to 1965 the average county school had been functioning in the church. The school was closed in 1965. The building was given to the collective farm for storage facilities.

Now the building of the church houses a warehouse of spare parts for agricultural machinery of the collective farm: equipment for the cattle-breeding complex, greenhouses, spare parts for cars and tractors. The building is not being restored.

== Architecture ==
In the original construction plan the building had an even three-part structure: a church with a pentahedral apse, a refectory and a bell tower stretching along one axis. At the beginning of the 20th century the western part was significantly expanded by the addition of side chapels. The altars partially covered the bottom of the church dimension.

A quadrangle church is divided by a cornice at the apse level and a refectory. The windows of the lower tier are given flat ledged window surrounds. In the upper tier there are two rows of windows. Here in the piers both to the right and to the left of the corners are drawn rustic pilasters-thrusts, and at the end of the walls - a false multi-layered cornice.

The side-altars have triangular forceps and smooth walls with high arched windows. The belfry consists of massive four-sided tiers and is completed with a low eights, a dome and a spire. Inside the temple room is covered with a four-clot closed dome without a lantern. The refectory is communicated with the aisles with wide arches.

== Literature ==
- В.Е.Звагельская, ed. (2008). Свод памятников истории и культуры Свердловской области. Vol. 2. Екатеринбург: Сократ. p. 648. ISBN 978-5-88664-323-7.
- Бурлакова Н.Н. (2011). Забытые храмы Свердловской области. Екатеринбург: Сократ. pp. 128–129. ISBN 978-5-88664-395-4.
- Приходы и церкви Екатеринбургской епархии. Екатеринбург: Братство Св. Праведного Симеона Верхотурского Чудотворца. 1902.
