= Stamatinești Church =

Heritage site in Vrancea County, Romania

Coordinates: 45°41′56″N 27°11′30″E

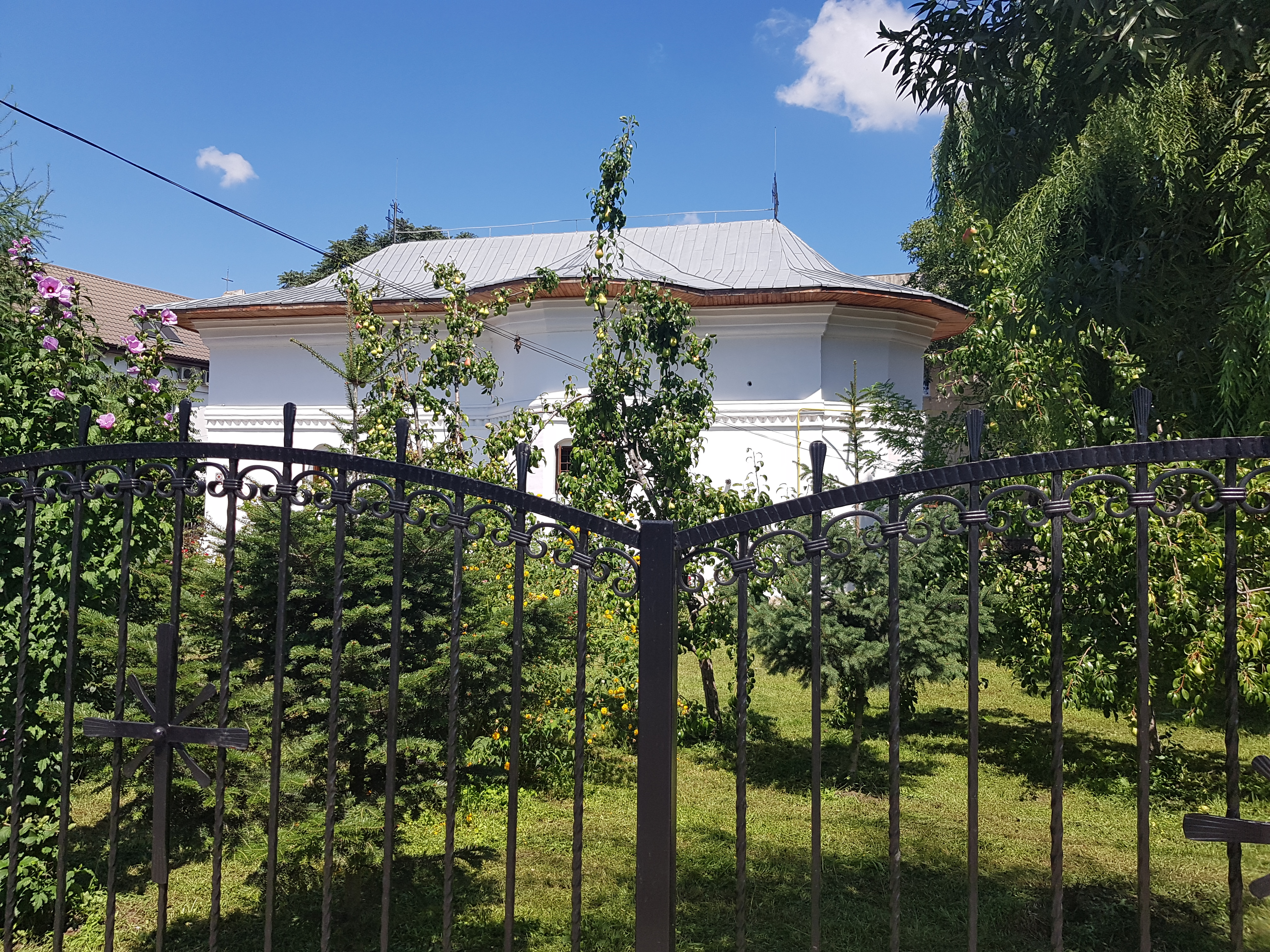
Stamatinești Church

The Stamatinești Church (Romanian: Biserica Sfinții Voievozi - Stamatinești) is a Romanian Orthodox church located at 5 Moldova Street in Focșani, Romania. It is dedicated to the Archangels Michael and Gabriel.

The church ktetor was the ban Toma Stamatin. As it was initially a private chapel for the family, the church took this name. It was built between 1789 and 1798 on the site of an old wooden church that had been destroyed by fire. The poet Grigore Alexandrescu, who worked at the local customs house, married Raluca Stamatin in the family chapel in 1860.

The church is trefoil shaped, with narthex, nave and altar. A row of bricks above the windows divides the facades into two horizontal registers. A fragment of the 18th-century wall survives to the east. The church and wall are listed as historic monuments by Romania's Ministry of Culture and Religious Affairs.
