= Church of the Holy Archangels, Pașcani =

Heritage site in Iași County, Romania

Coordinates: 47°15′05″N 26°43′19″E

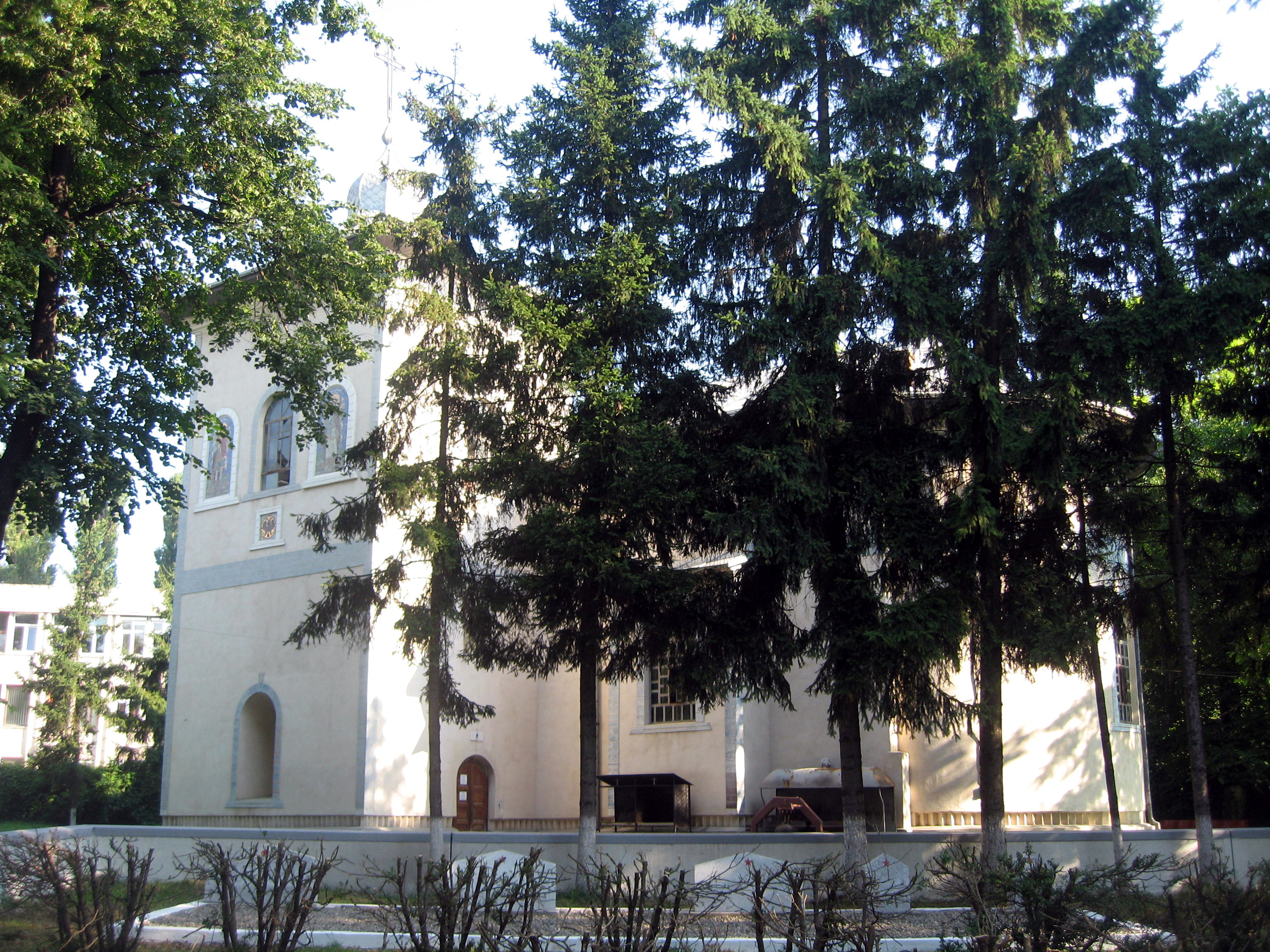
Church of the Holy Archangels

The Church of the Holy Archangels (Romanian: Biserica Sfinții Voievozi) is a Romanian Orthodox church located at Aleea Parcului 5, Pașcani, Romania. Dating from 1664 and dedicated to the Archangels Michael and Gabriel, it is listed as a historic monument by Romania's Ministry of Culture and Religious Affairs.
