= St. Michael the Archangel Church, Bishkek =

St. Michael the Archangel Church
- St. Michael the Archangel Church
- 42.90247°N 74.58081°E
- Location: Bishkek
- Country: Kyrgyzstan
- Denomination: Roman Catholic Church

History
- Founded: 1969

Administration
- Division: Apostolic Administration of Kyrgyzstan

The St. Michael the Archangel Church or the Parish of St. Michael the Archangel is a religious building belonging to the Roman Catholic Church, located in Bishkek at 197 Vasileva Street near Bayat bazaar in the capital of Kyrgyzstan. Although there are three Catholic parishes and other meeting places in the nation, the building is considered the only Catholic church and the center of this Christian denomination in Kyrgyzstan.

To access the site you must take a bus from the Osh Bazaar. Masses celebrated in both English and Russian are held on Sundays by the Society of Jesus. Its history goes back to 1969 when it was built by ethnic Germans who were forced to move to this area at the time of the Soviet deportations of Joseph Stalin in the 1930s and 1940s. The church was built as a one-story structure in order not to be visible among private houses. In 1981, it was decided to expand the building so they built a second floor to make room for more parishioners.

== See also ==
- St. Michael's Church
- Roman Catholicism in Kyrgyzstan
