= List of Armenian churches in Russia =

The following is a list of Armenian Apostolic churches in Russia.

== Southern Federal District ==
=== Adygea ===
- Saint John Church (Surb Hovhannes), Maykop

=== Astrakhan Oblast ===
- Saint Hripsime Church, Astrakhan

=== Volgograd Oblast ===
- Saint Gevorg Church, Volgograd

=== Dagestan ===
- Church of the Holy All-Savior of Derbent
- Armenian chapel, Kizlyar (opened in 2005)
- St Grigoris Church, Nyugdi, near Derbent

=== Krasnodar Krai ===
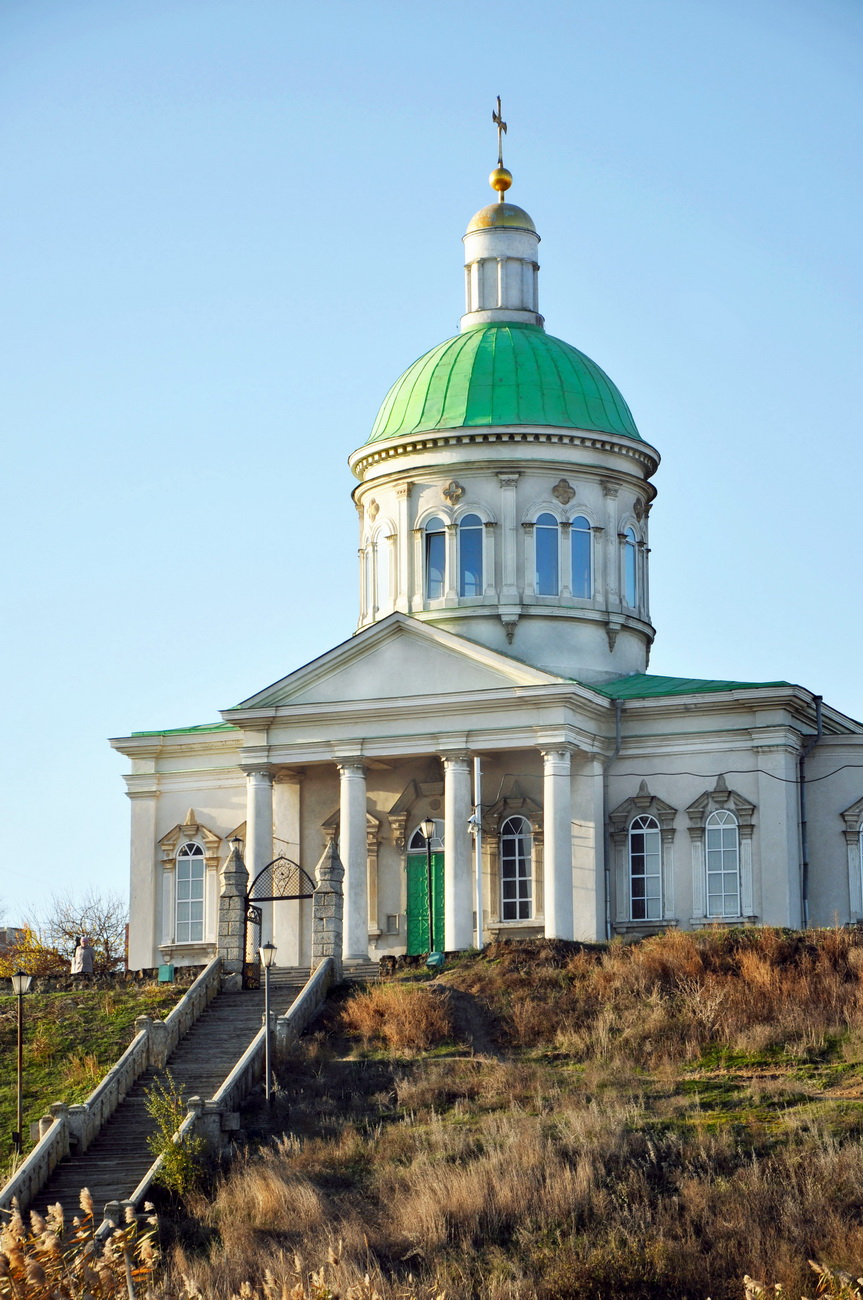
Holy Cross Church, Rostov-on-Don

In 2007 in the province there were at least 15 Armenian churches and chapels.

- Church of the Blessed Virgin Mary, Armavir (start of construction in 1843, sanctification in 1861)
- Saint Sarkis Cathedral, Adler, Sochi
- Church of the Holy Cross (Surb Khach), Sochi
- Saint Sarkis Church, Sochi
- Saint John Church (Surb Hovhannes), Loo, Lazarevsky City District, Sochi
- Church of St. John the Evangelist, Krasnodar
- Church of the Holy Assumption, Тенгинка (modern church built in 2003)
- Half-ruined old church, Tenginka

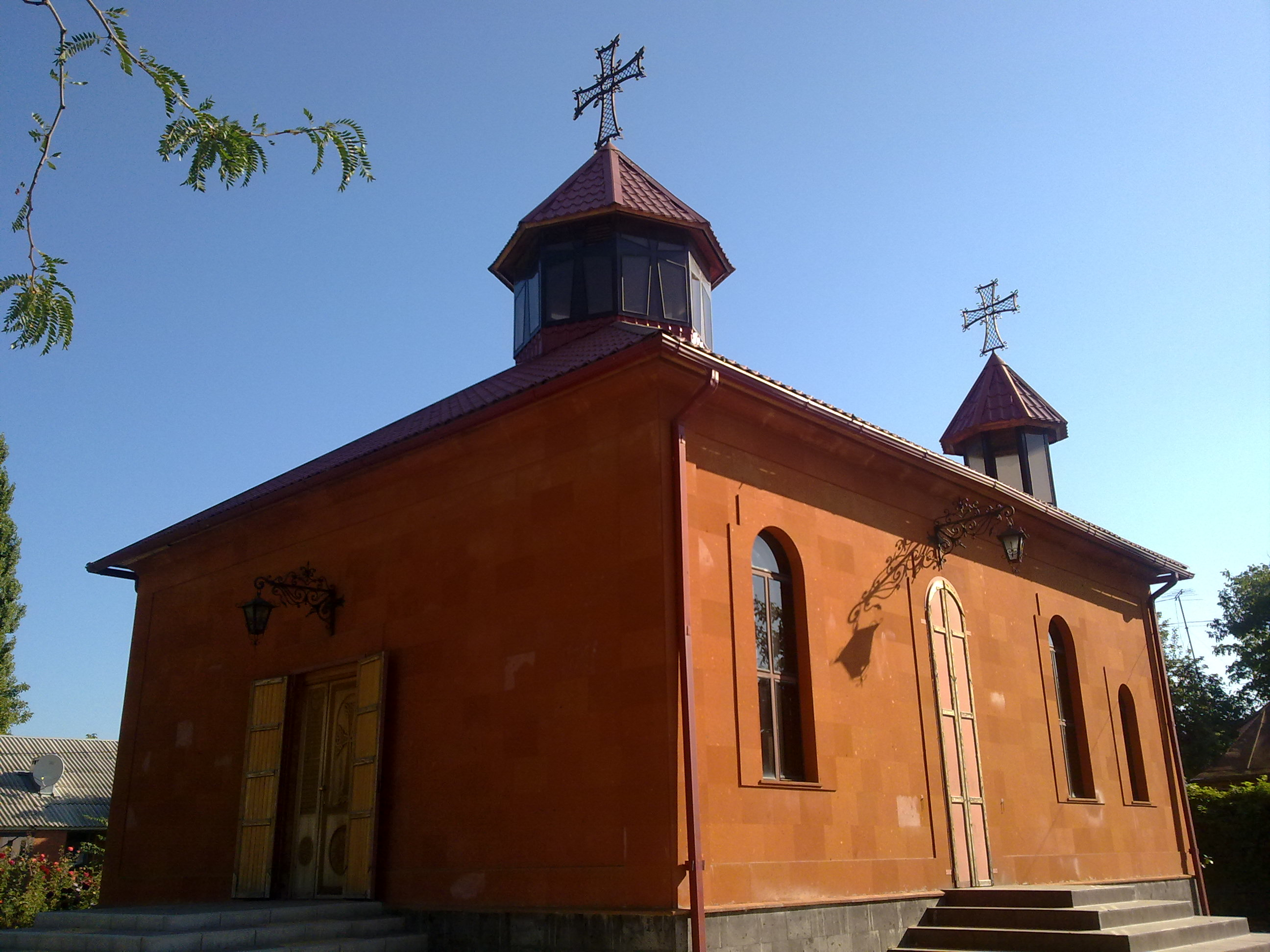
Armenian church of Saint Sargis in Slavyansk-na-Kubani (Russia). Main view.

- Saint Sarkis Church, Slavyansk-on-Kuban

=== Rostov Oblast ===
- Church of the Holy Cross, Rostov-on-Don (1786–1792)
- Saint Karapet Church, Rostov-on-Don
- Church of the Ascension (Chaltyr) Surb Hambardzum Church (Assumption), Chaltyr (built in 1860s)
- All-Savior Church (Surb Amenaprkich), Krym (built in the middle of the 19th century)
- Saint Gevorg Church, Sultan-Sali (built in the middle of the 19th century)
- Saint Karapet Church (John the Baptist), Nesvetay (built in the middle of the 19th century)
- Church of the Holy Mother of God, Bolshiye Saly (Surb Astvatsatsin)(Assumption), Bolshiye Saly (1856)
- Saint Gregory the Illuminator (under construction), Novocherkassk

=== North Ossetia–Alania ===
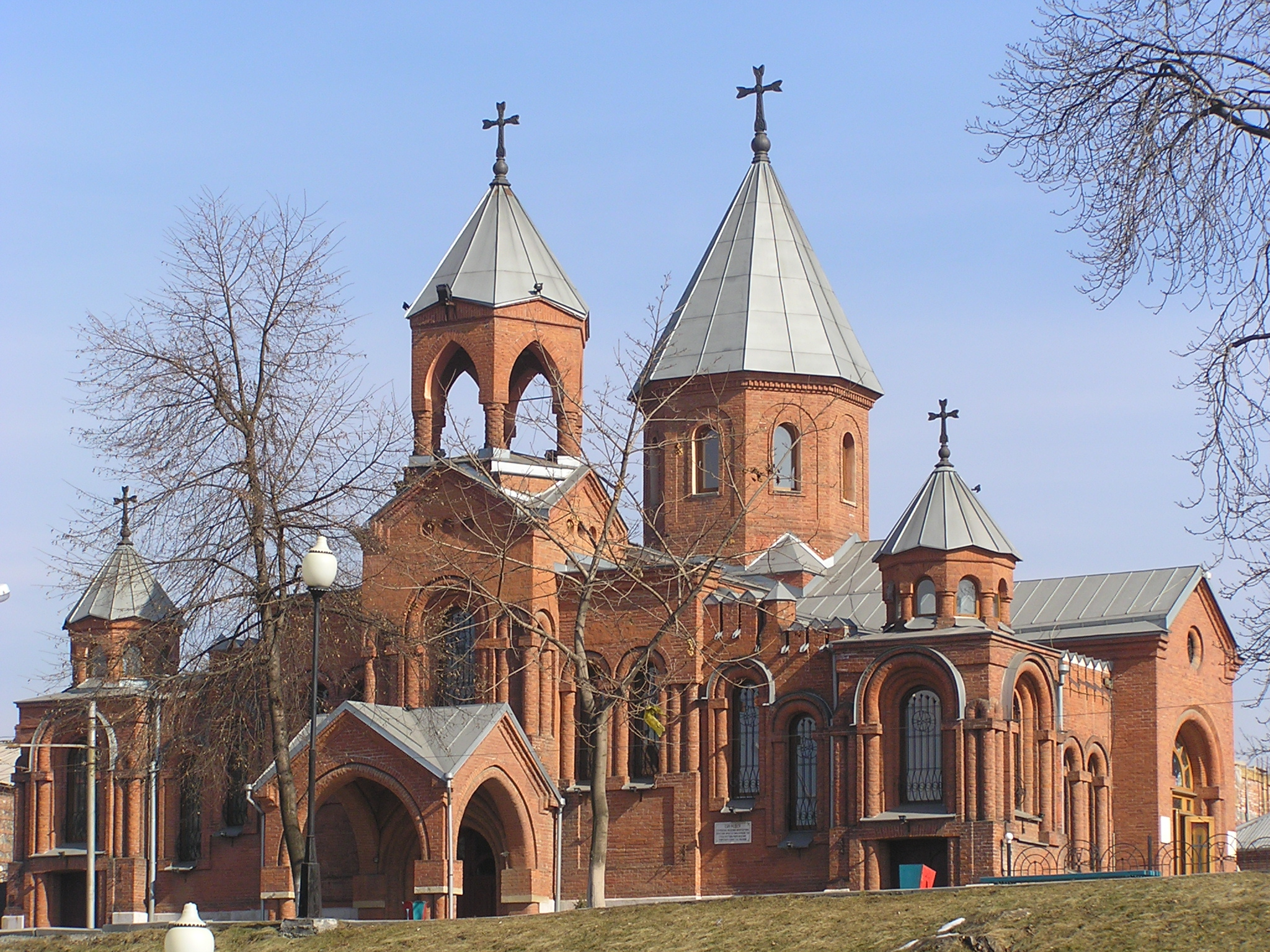
Armenian Church in Vladikavkaz

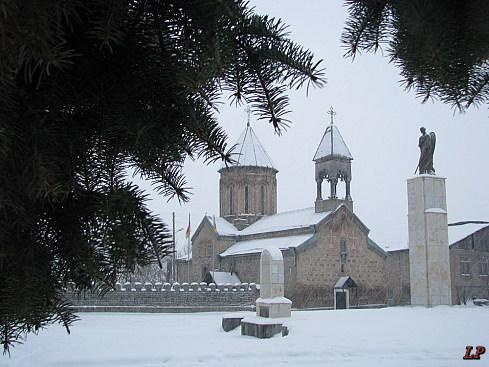
Armenian church Surb Astvatsatsin in South Ossetia.

- Saint Gregory the Illuminator Church, Vladikavkaz
- Surb Astvatsatsin Church, Vladikavkaz

=== Stavropol Krai ===
For the year 2007 in the province operated 7 Armenian religious institutions and one built.

- Church of Virgin Mary(Surb Astvatsatsin), Edissa(founded in 1830, a modern building in 1914)
- Church of the Holy Cross (Surb Khach), Budennovsk

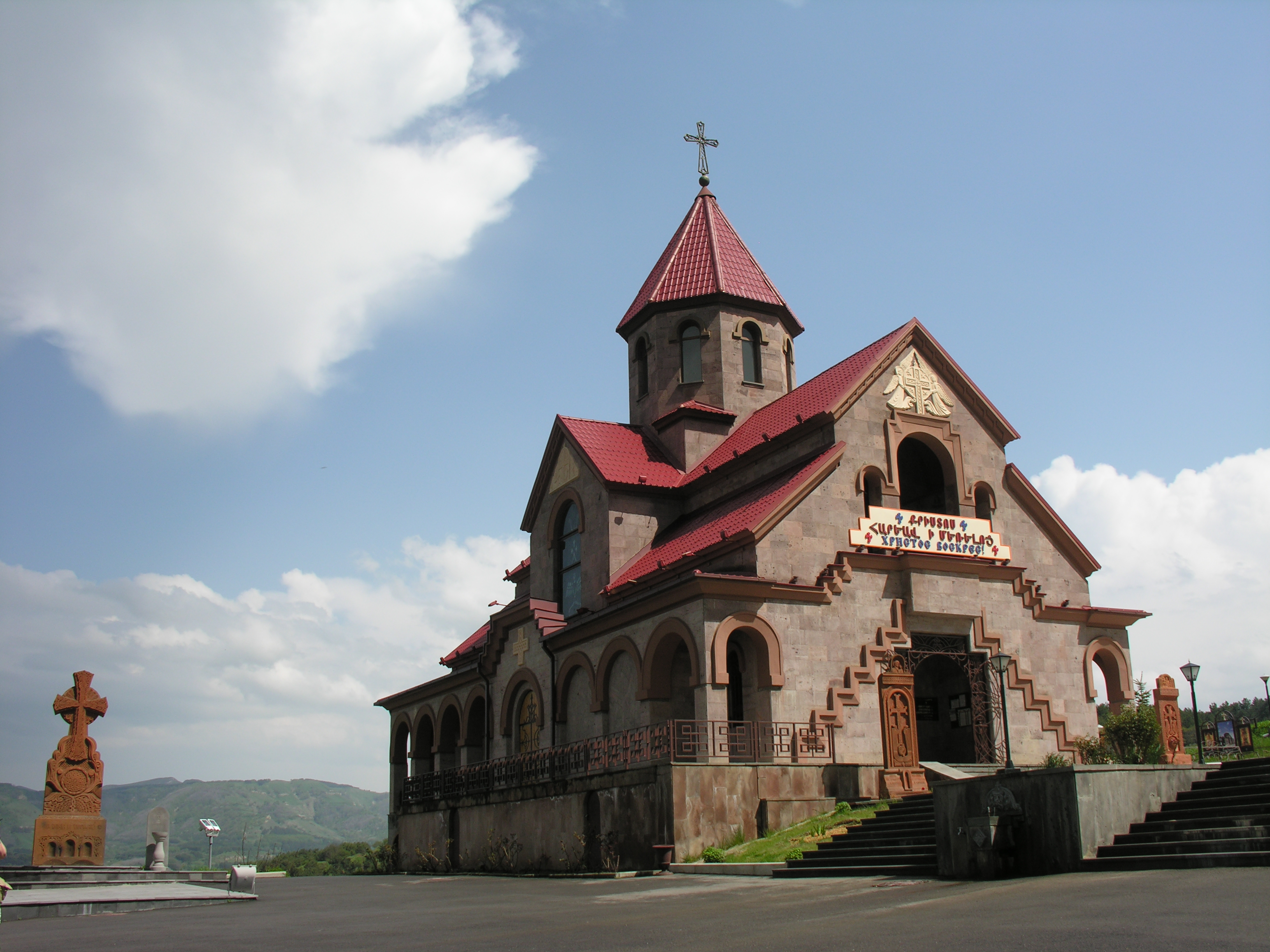
Armenian Church in Kislovodsk, Russia.

- Church of Vardan Mamikonian, Kislovodsk
- Saint Sarkis Church, Pyatigorsk
- Chapel of Saint Gevorg (church is building), Georgievsk
- Chapel of Saint Mary Magdalene (church is building), Stavropol
- Chapel of Saint Hripsime (church is building), Essentuki
- Church of Christ the Savior, Suvorovskaya

== Volga Federal District ==
=== Kirov Oblast ===
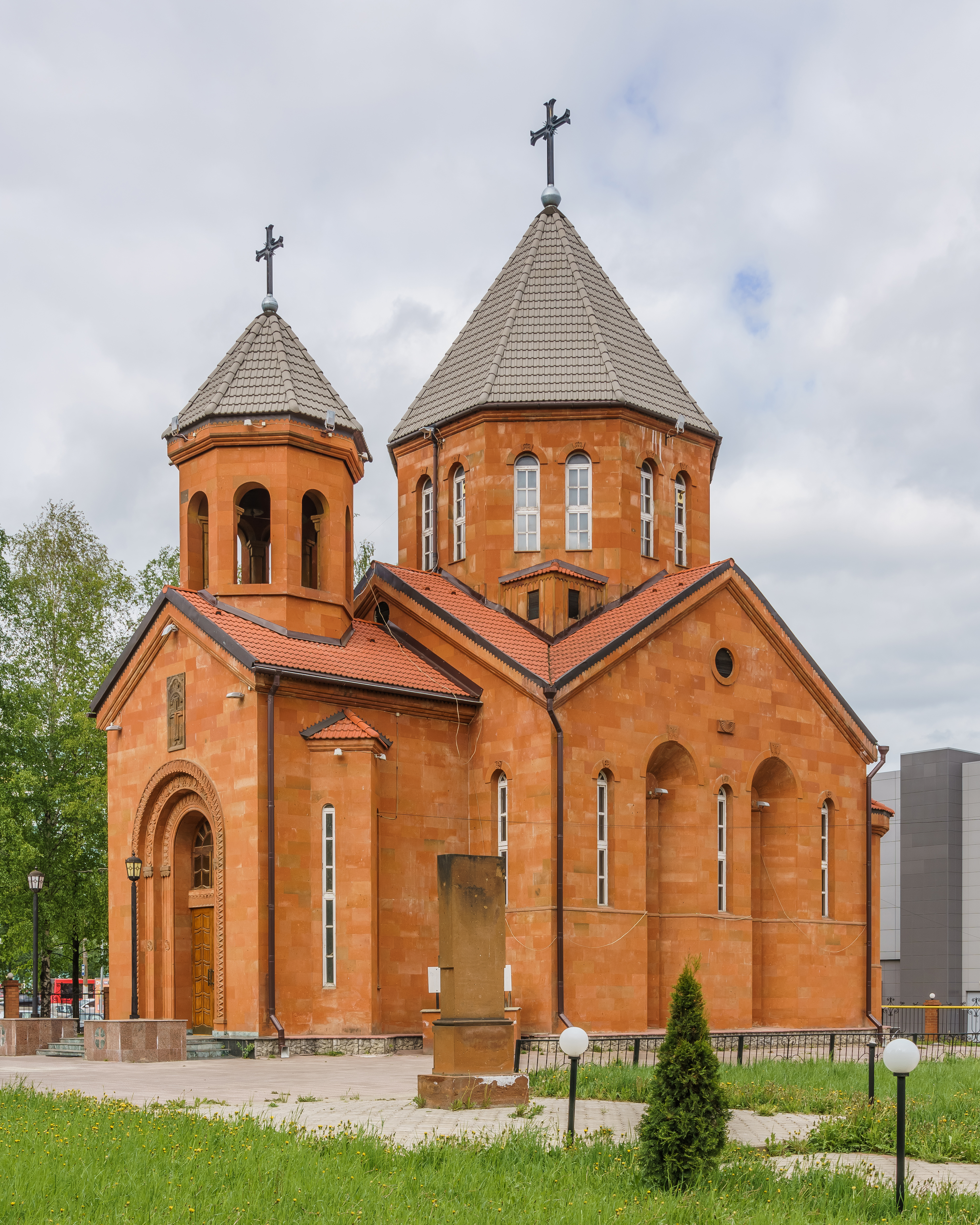
Christ the All Saviour Armenian church in Kirov, Russia.

- Church of Christ the Savior, Kirov Oblast

=== Samara Oblast ===
- Church of the Holy Cross, Samara

== Central Federal District ==
=== Moscow/Moscow Oblast ===
- Armenian Cathedral of Moscow
- Church of the Holy Resurrection, Moscow
- Srbots Nahatakats Church, Moscow (under construction)

== Siberian Federal District ==
=== Altai Krai ===
- Saint Hripsime Church, Barnaul

=== Kemerovo Oblast ===
- Church of Saint Gregory the Illuminator, 2008, village Sosnovka

=== Krasnoyarsk Krai ===
- Saint Sarkis Church, Krasnoyarsk

=== Novosibirsk Oblast ===
- Surb Astvatsatsin, Novosibirsk

== Northwestern Federal District ==
=== Saint Petersburg/Leningrad Oblast ===
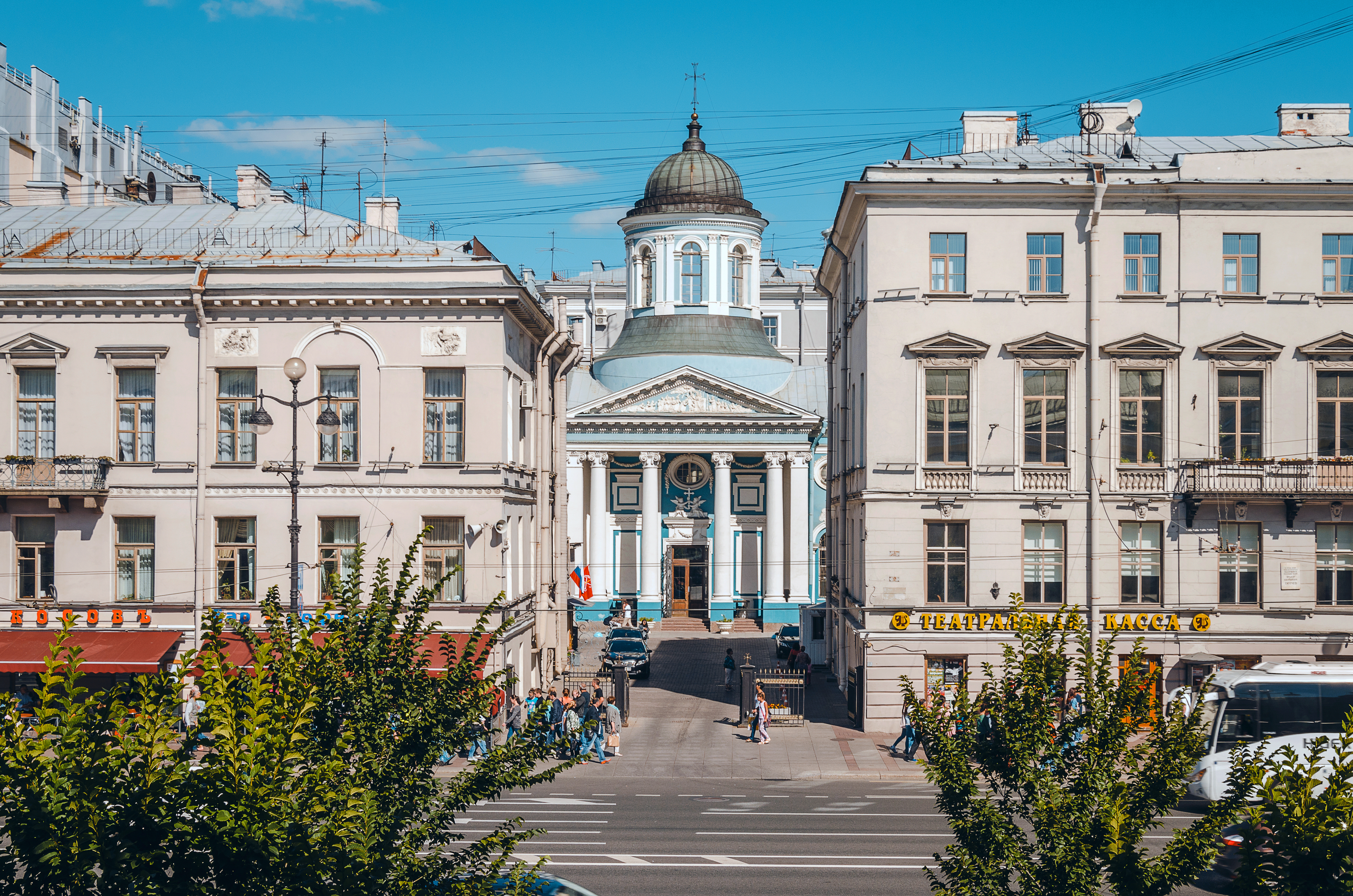
St. Catherine Armenian church in St.Petersburg.

- Church of the Blessed Virgin Mary, Vsevolozhsk
- Church of Saint Catherine, Saint Petersburg (1771–1776)
- Church of the Holy Resurrection, Saint Petersburg

=== Kaliningrad Oblast ===
- Saint Stephanos Church, Kaliningrad
