= St. George's Church (Sultan-Saly) =

Church in Sultan-Saly, Russia

St. George Church Սուրբ Խաչ Եկեղեցի
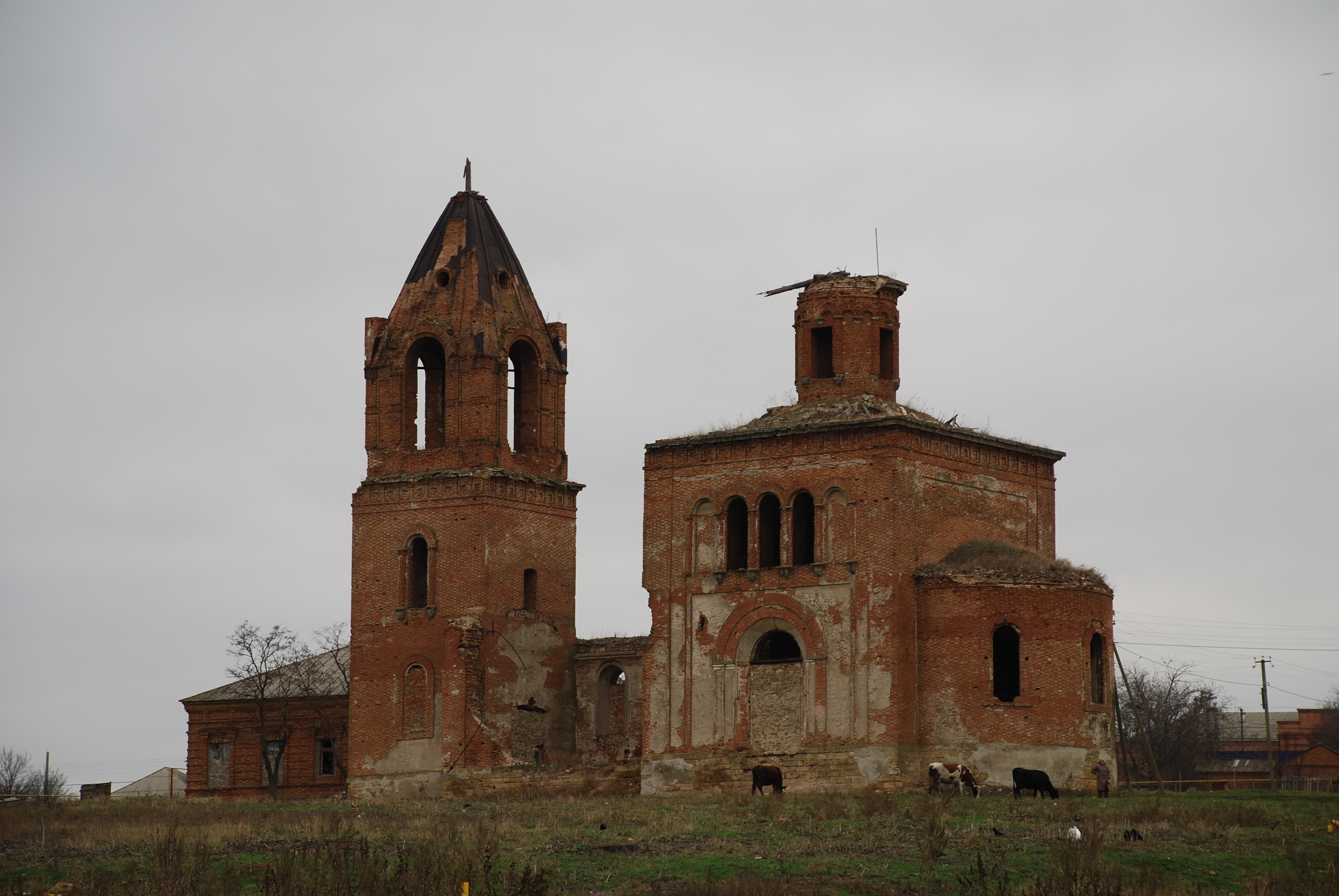
- St. George Church, Sultan-Saly

- Location within Russia

Religion
- Affiliation: Armenian Apostolic Church
- Rite: Armenian

Location
- Location: Sultan-Saly (ru), Rostov; Russia
- Interactive map of St. George Church; Սուրբ Խաչ Եկեղեցի
- Coordinates: 47.3559965°N 39.58427399°E

Architecture
- Completed: 1795

The Saint George's Church (Russian: Церковь Святого Георгия, Armenian: Սուրբ Գևորգ Եկեղեցի) is an Armenian Apostolic church in Sultan-Saly village, Myasnikovsky District, Rostov Oblast, Russia.

== History ==
At the end of the eighteenth century, Catherine II issued a decree on the resettlement of Armenians from the Crimea to the Azov Sea region. In 1779, thousands of Armenians arrived to the new place of residence and founded the villages of Chaltyr, Crimea, Bolshiye Saly, Sultan Saly and Nesvetay. The village of Sultan Saly was founded in 1779, and the village church of Saint George church was built in 1795.

In 1848 the church was already dilapidated and its parishioners appealed to the consistory for permission to collect donations for renovation. Harutyun Khalivov, the mayor of Novo-Nakhichevan was in charge of fund collection company. Later, parishioners decided that instead of repairing the church it would be better to build a new one, especially considering the fact that in 1849 the church was looted.

Construction of a new church was finished in 1850. In 1854, it was decided to improve the newly rebuilt church. In 1858, permission for rebuilding was given by authorities.

In March 1864 the old church was arbitrarily demolished by parishioners, and in 1867 a new church was completely reconstructed and consecrated.

In 1872 a parish school was opened. In 1908 it had 126 students.

The church building was damaged on October 28, 1896, when the dome with a cross was destroyed during a violent storm. Under Soviet rule, in 1930, the church was closed.

The church was also damaged from shelling during World War II.

== Architecture ==
The square prayer hall, covered with a dome on pandatas with a small lantern, is united by three-door openings in the eastern part with a semicircular altar apse, and in the western part it joins with a rectangular vaulted porch. To the porch adjoins a three-tiered bell tower.

== Gallery ==
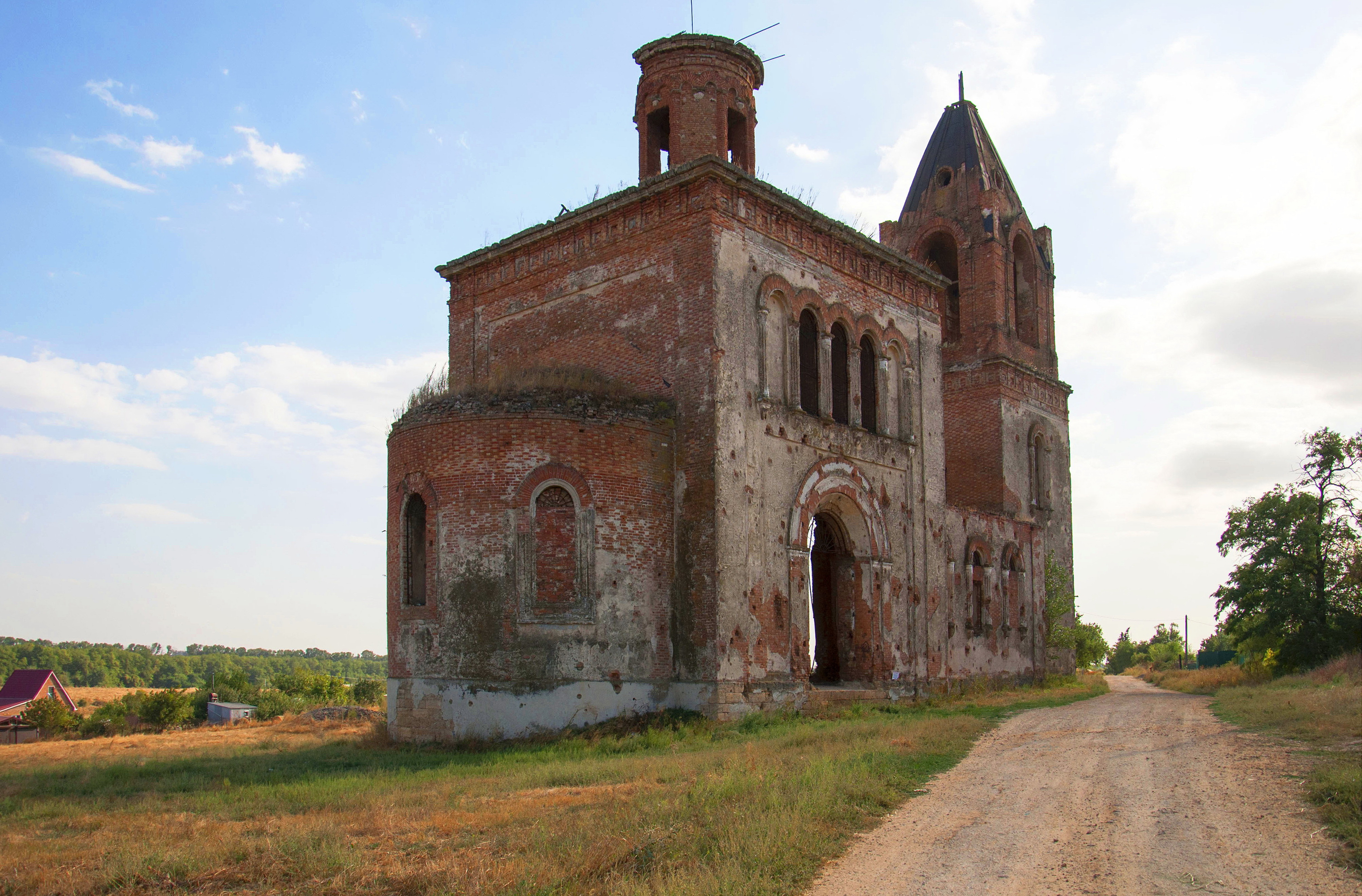

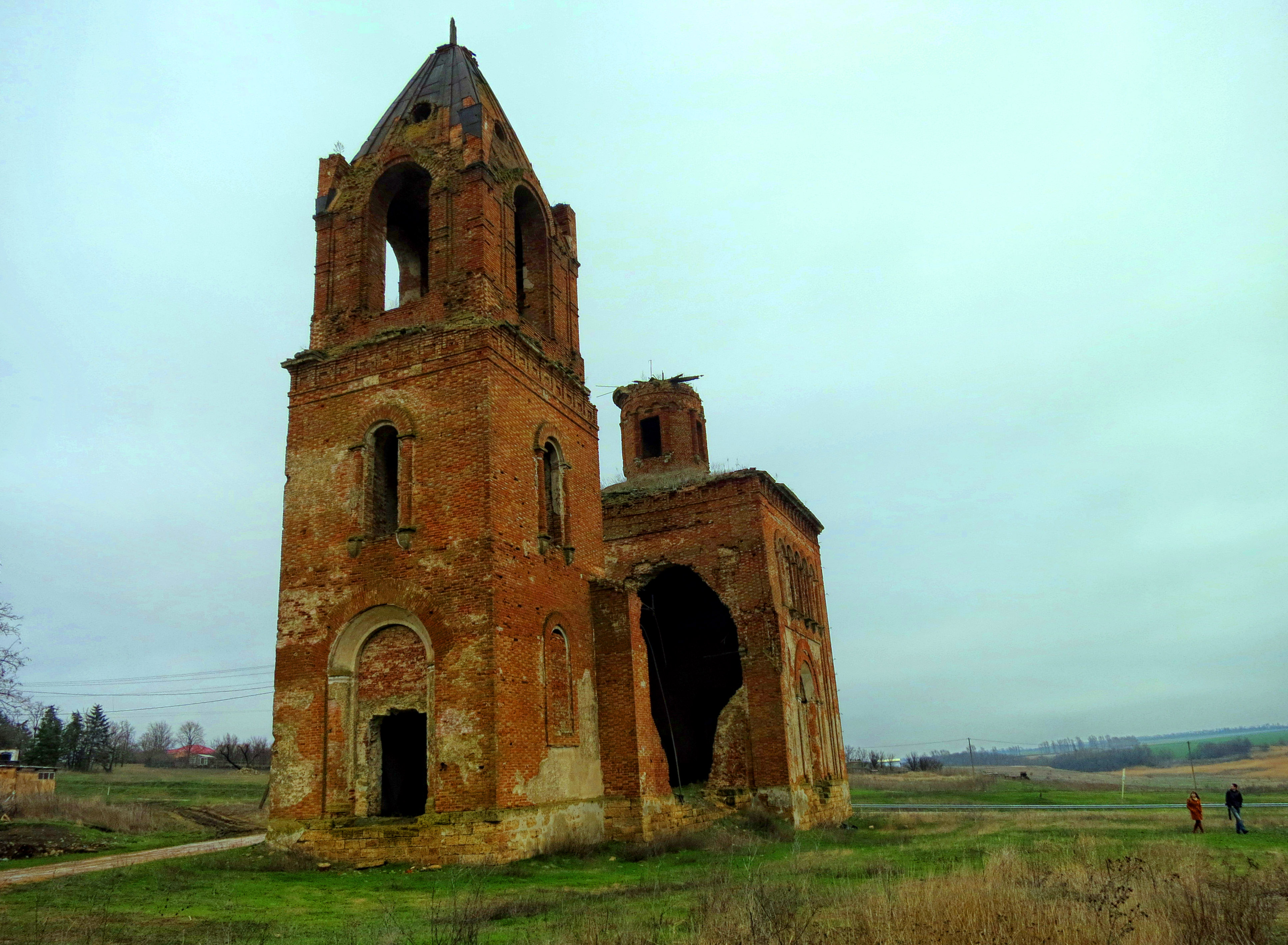

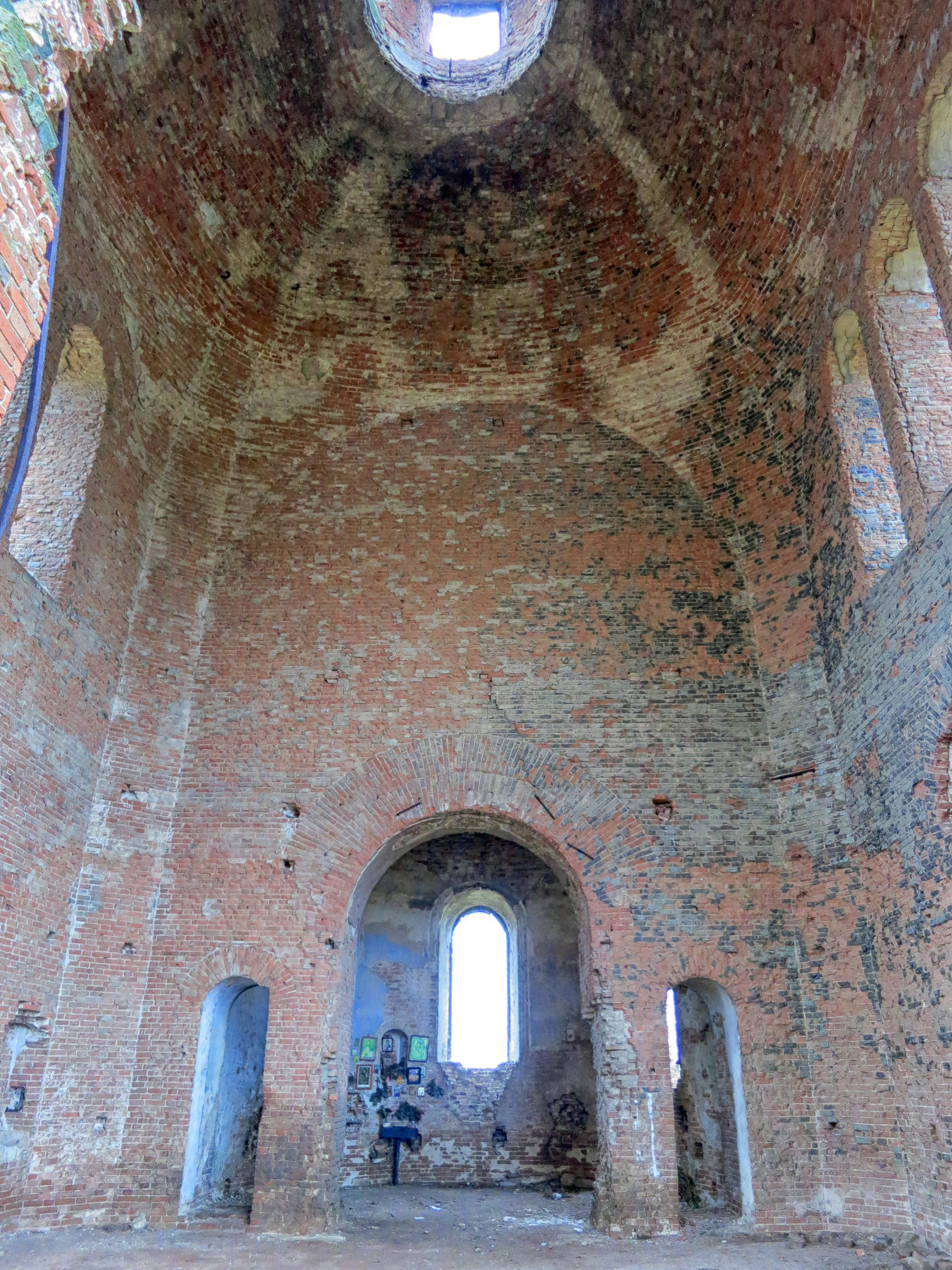

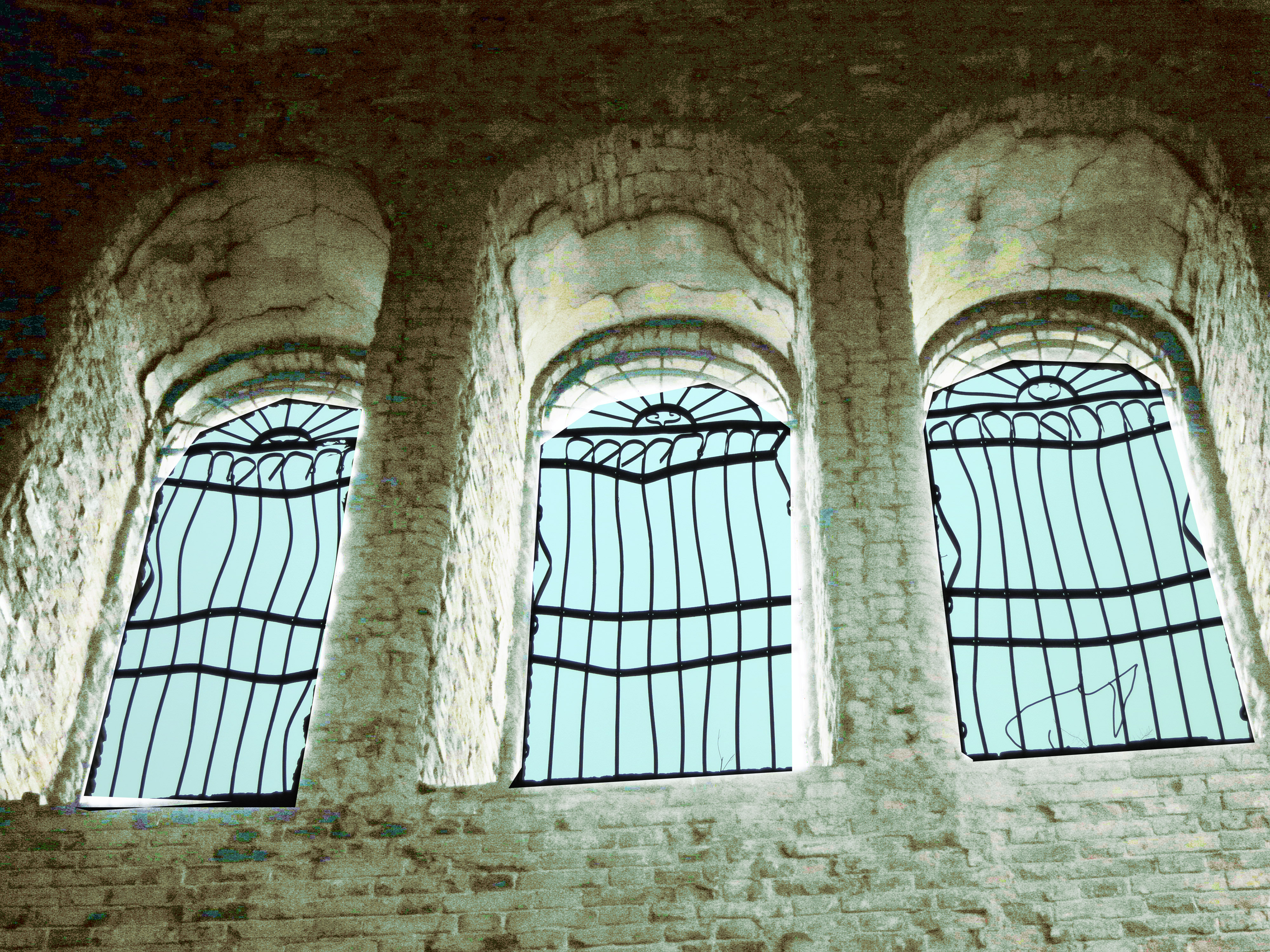

== Literature ==
(in Russian)

- Вартанян В.Г., Казаров С.С. Армянская-Апостольская Церковь на Дону // Ростов н/Д., 2001 Е.И.
- Халпахчьян О.X. Архитектура Нахичевани-на-Дону // Ер. 1988
- Шахазиз Е. Новый Нахичеван и новонахичеванцы / Перевод с армянского Ш. М. Шагиняна // Ростов-на-Дону, 1999
- Российская и Ново-Нахичеванская епархия Армянской Апостольской Церкви. Исторический путь. М., 2013
