= Suvorov Monument (Azov) =

Monument to Alexander Suvorov
- Памятник Александру Суворову
- Interactive map of Monument to Alexander Suvorov
- Location: Azov, Rostov Oblast, Russia
- Coordinates: 47.1170°N 39.4212°E
- Opening date: 2014
- Dedicated to: Alexander Suvorov

Monument to Alexander Suvorov (Russian: Памятник Александру Суворову) is a monument to a Russian Generalissimo Alexander Vasilyevich Suvorov in the city of Azov, Rostov Oblast, Russia. It was installed in 2014 on the territory of Powder Cellar Museum.

== History ==
Rosotv Oblast has about a dozen monuments to Alexander Suvorov. His name is given to the streets and several educational institutions. The name of Suvorov is also linked with the history of Azov. In the years 1778-1779, Alexander Suvorov inspected the construction of Azov-Mozdok's defensive line, which was laid down after Russo-Turkish War of 1768-1774. He visited Azov fortress several times. The main operations in the Russian-Turkish war were conducted under the command of Suvorov.

At the petition of Suvorov to Empress Catherine II, the Crimean Armenians began to settle on the Don. There, they founded the city of Nakhichevan-on-Don, the villages of Crimea, Chaltyr, Bolshiye Saly, Sultan-Saly, Nesvetay.

On July 19, 2014, in the city of Azov, a monument to Suvorov installed. The date of the opening was timed to the anniversary of Azov's final accession to the Russian Empire. The monument was erected on the territory Powder Cellar Museum.

== Description ==
The bust of Suvorov is mounted on a rectangular pedestal. It is installed next to the 18th-century building of military engineering, a powder cellar. Next to the powder cellar, there is a house where the commander stayed at his time. The pedestal has an inscription: "Alexander Vasilyevich Suvorov 1730–1800. The great Russian military commander, Generalissimo, Prince of Italy, Count Ryminsky." On all sides of the monument, there are plaques that tell about his life. Two old cannons around the monument.

== See also ==
- List of monuments and memorials in Azov
