= Powder Cellar =

Powder Cellar may refer to:

- The Powder Cellar Museum is a museum in the city of Azov, Rostov Oblast, Russia. It is a branch of Azov History, Archaeology and Paleontology Museum-Reserve.
- Gunpowder Cellar of Tartu is a historic building in Tartu, Estonia which now functions as a beer restaurant.
