= Suvorov Monument =

Suvorov Monument may refer to:

- Suvorov Monument (Saint Petersburg)
- Suvorov Monument (Tiraspol)
- Suvorov Monument (Azov)
