= Church of the Ascension (Chaltyr) =

Church in Rostov Oblast, Russia

- Russian: Церковь Святого Вознесения, Armenian: Սուրբ Համբարձում Եկեղեցի
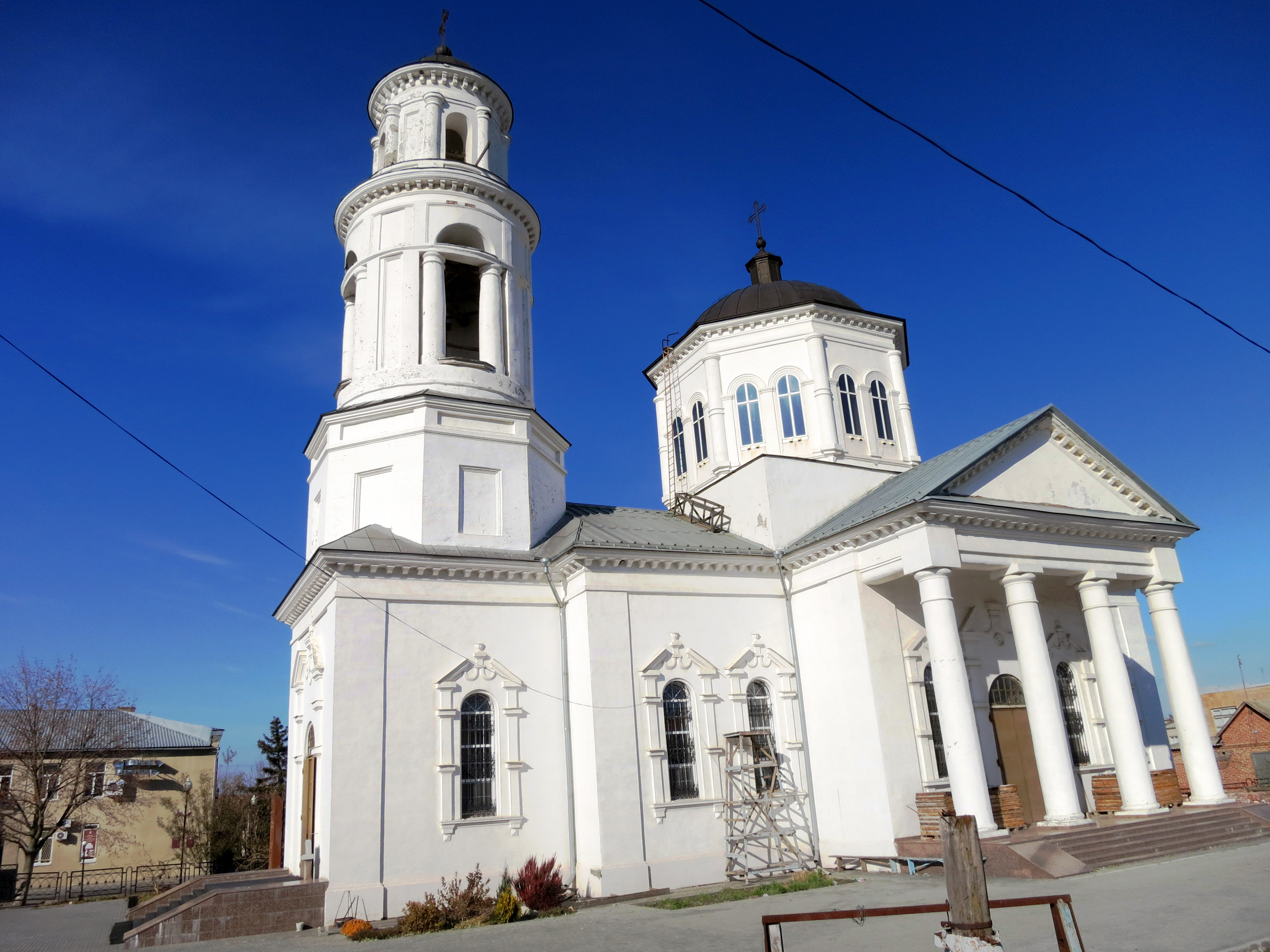
- Church of the Ascension
- Location: Chaltyr village, Myasnikovsky District, Rostov Oblast, Russia
- Country: Russia
- Denomination: Armenian Apostolic Church

History
- Status: Parish church
- Dedication: Ascension of Jesus

Administration
- Diocese: Russia and New Nakhichevan

The Church of the Ascension (Russian: Церковь Святого Вознесения, Armenian: Սուրբ Համբարձում Եկեղեցի) is an Armenian Apostolic church in Chaltyr village, Myasnikovsky District, Rostov Oblast, Russia.

== History ==
The Church in the name of the Holy Ascension in Chaltyr village was founded in 1790 by Armenians who resettled in Don from Crimea on the decree of Empress Catherine II issued on November 14, 1779.

This stone church had a wooden bell tower. Over time, it became dilapidated. The parishioners of Chaltyr village applied to the Novo-Nakhichevan and Bessarabian diocese of the Armenian Apostolic Church for permission to build a new church.

The permission was granted and in 1860 construction of a new church began. It was built on the project of Taganrog architect N. Muratov in Classicist style. The old church was demolished and at its site the building of parish school was constructed.

In 1883, the church was renovated. 12 new pedestals with saints' faces were built and three new doors with multi-colored stained-glass windows were installed. The church territory was surrounded with a forged fence.

During World War II, the church was closed and the building itself was used in different ways. In 1944 the church was reopened. In 1990 there was installed a khachkar, a copy of the khachkar of 1279, which is located in Holy Etchmiadzin in Armenia. The inscription on the pedestal khachkar says that it was installed in memory of the Turkish Genocide of Armenians in 1915.

== Architecture ==
The building was constructed in the form of a cross. It has slender proportions and architectural elements typical for churches in Nakhichevan. The high four-tier bell tower is similar to those of St. John the Baptist Church in the village of Nesvetay, and its side premises were constructed in the form of small rooms with exedra.

== Gallery ==
Interior

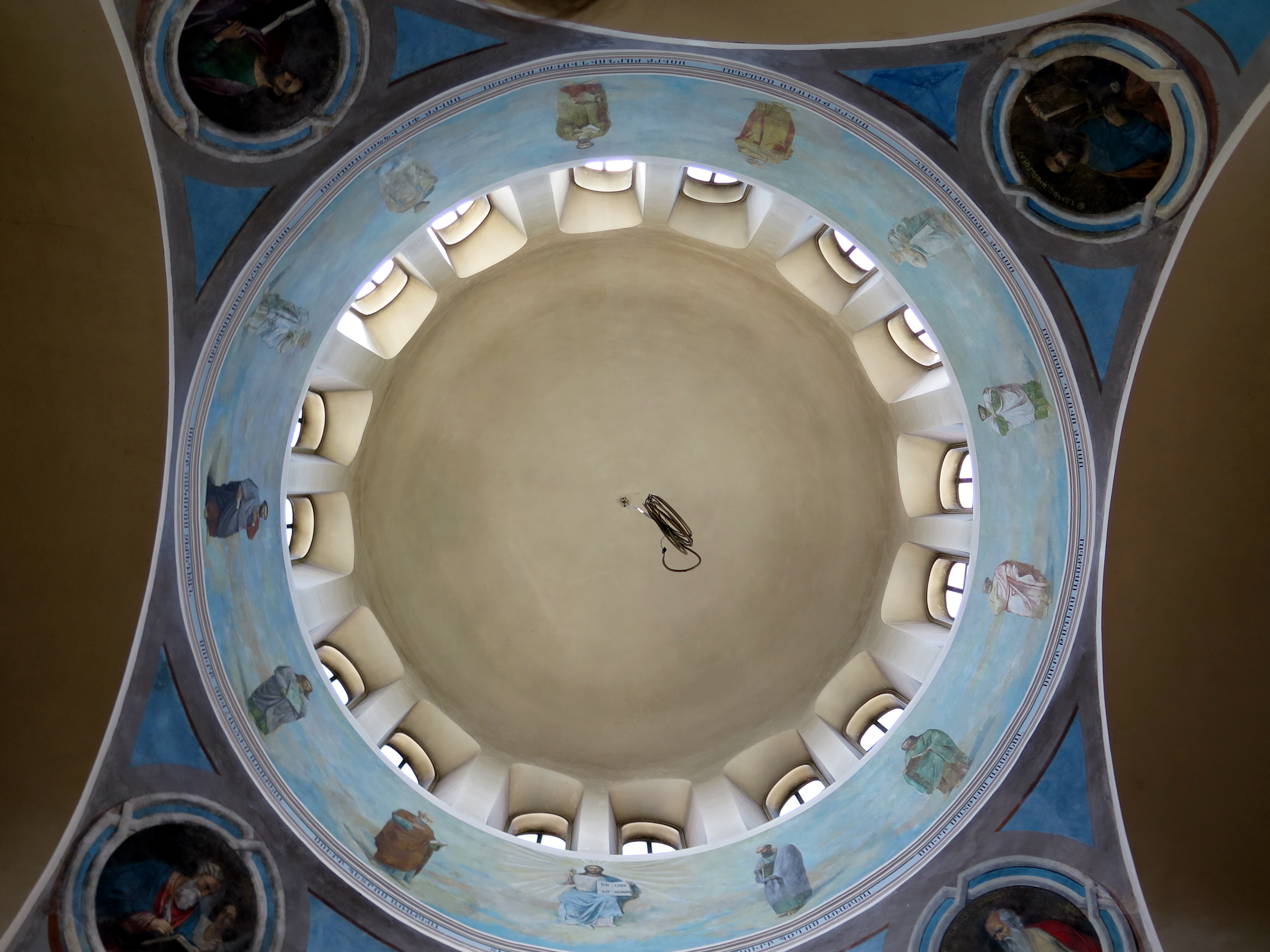

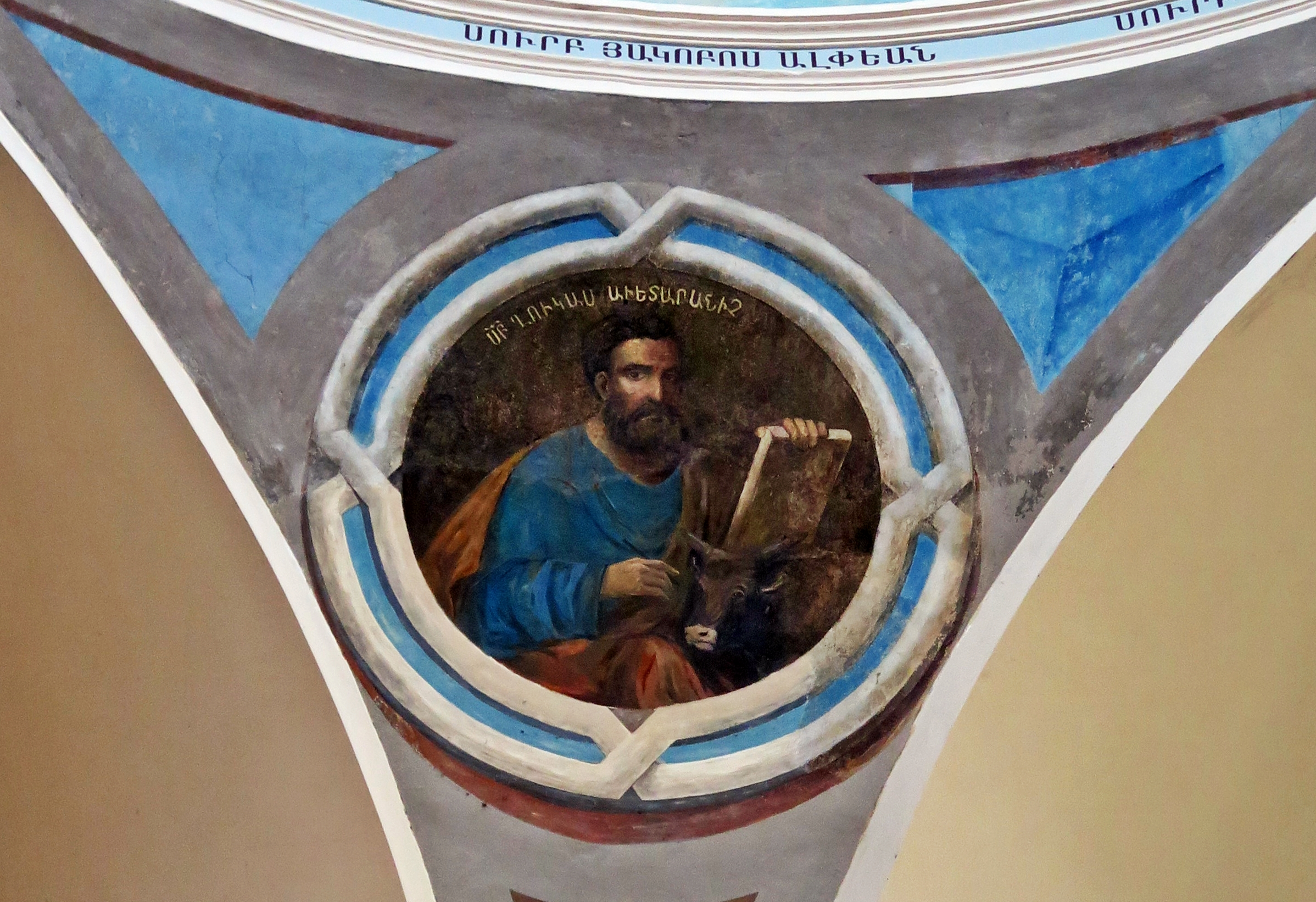

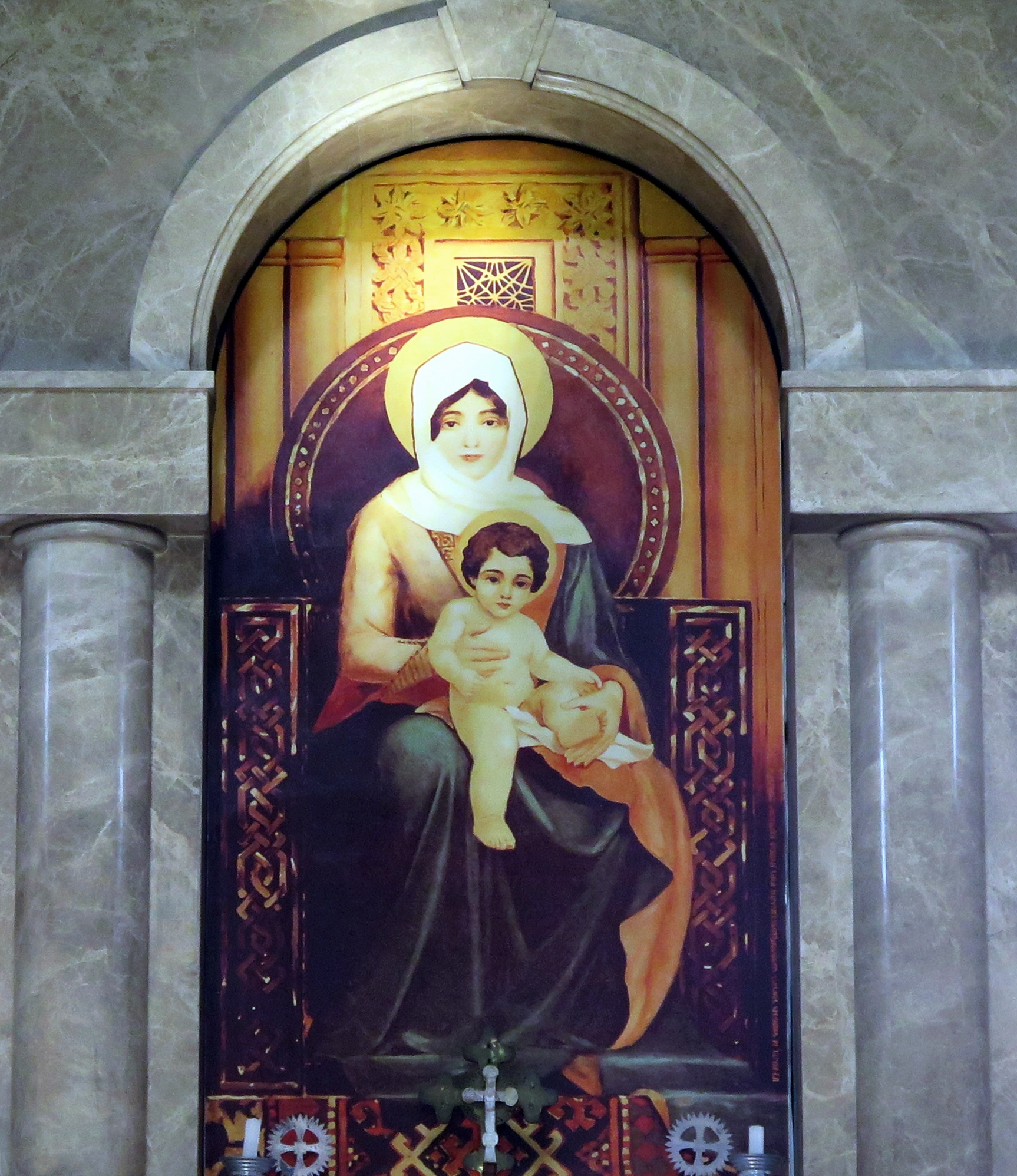

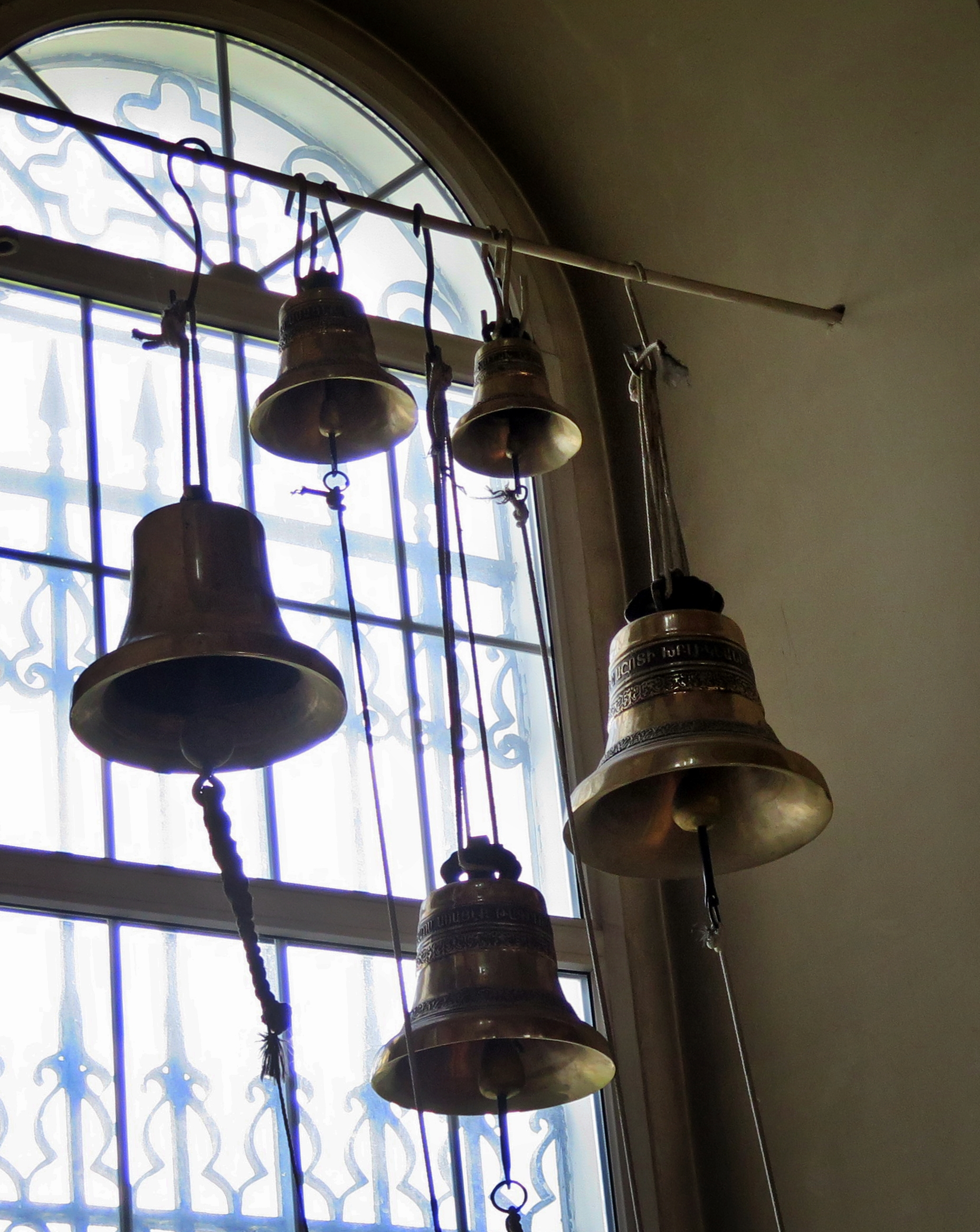

Exterior

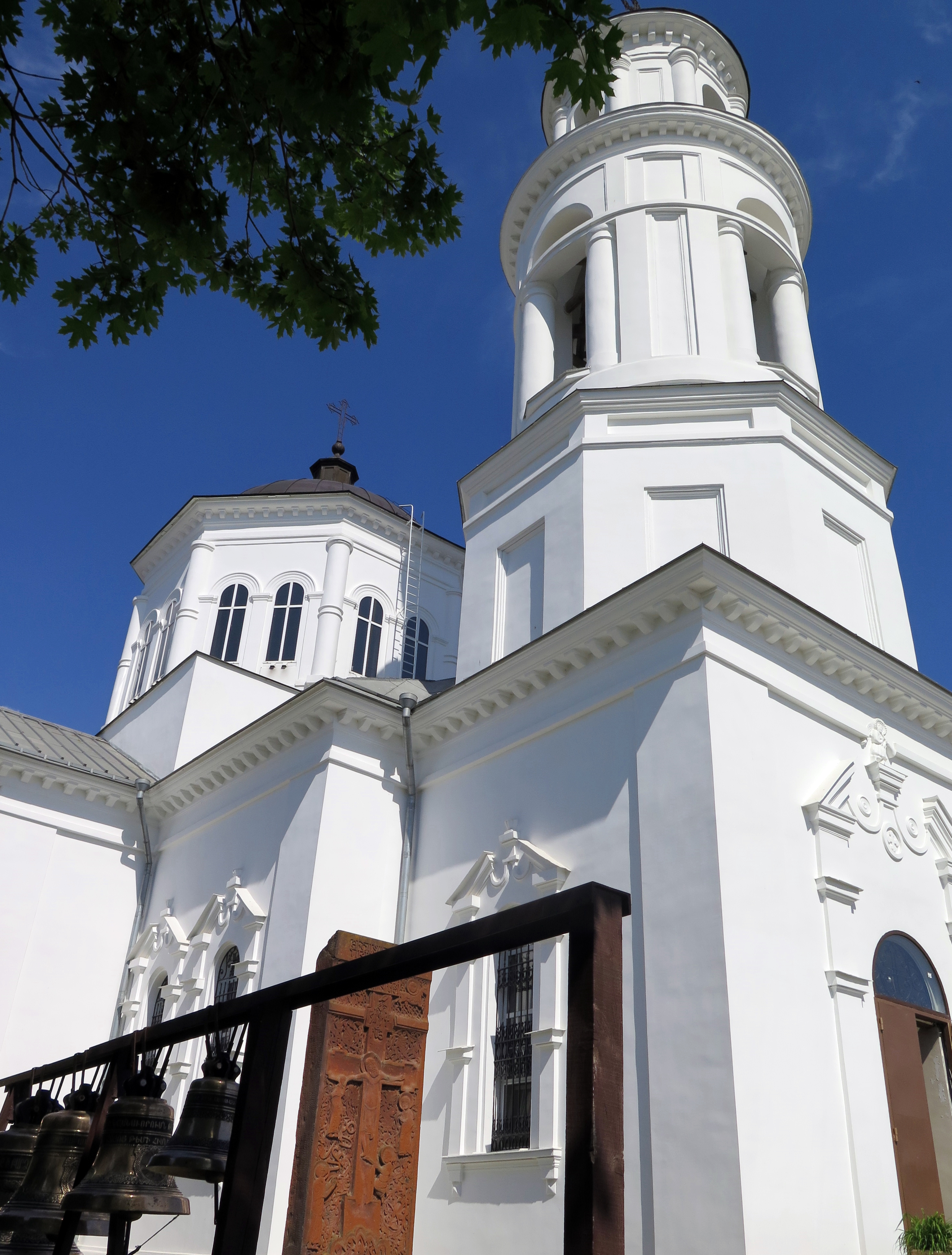

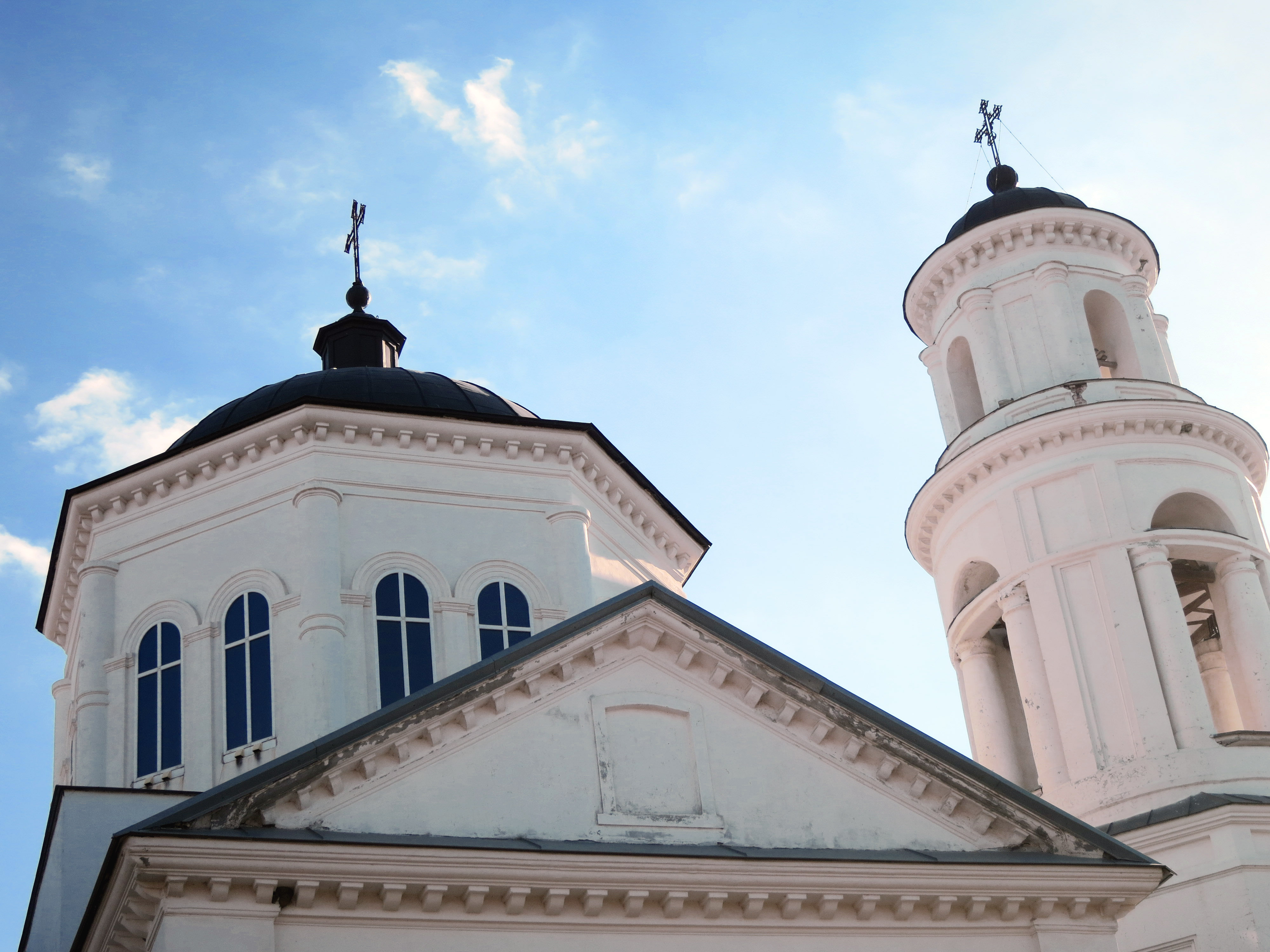

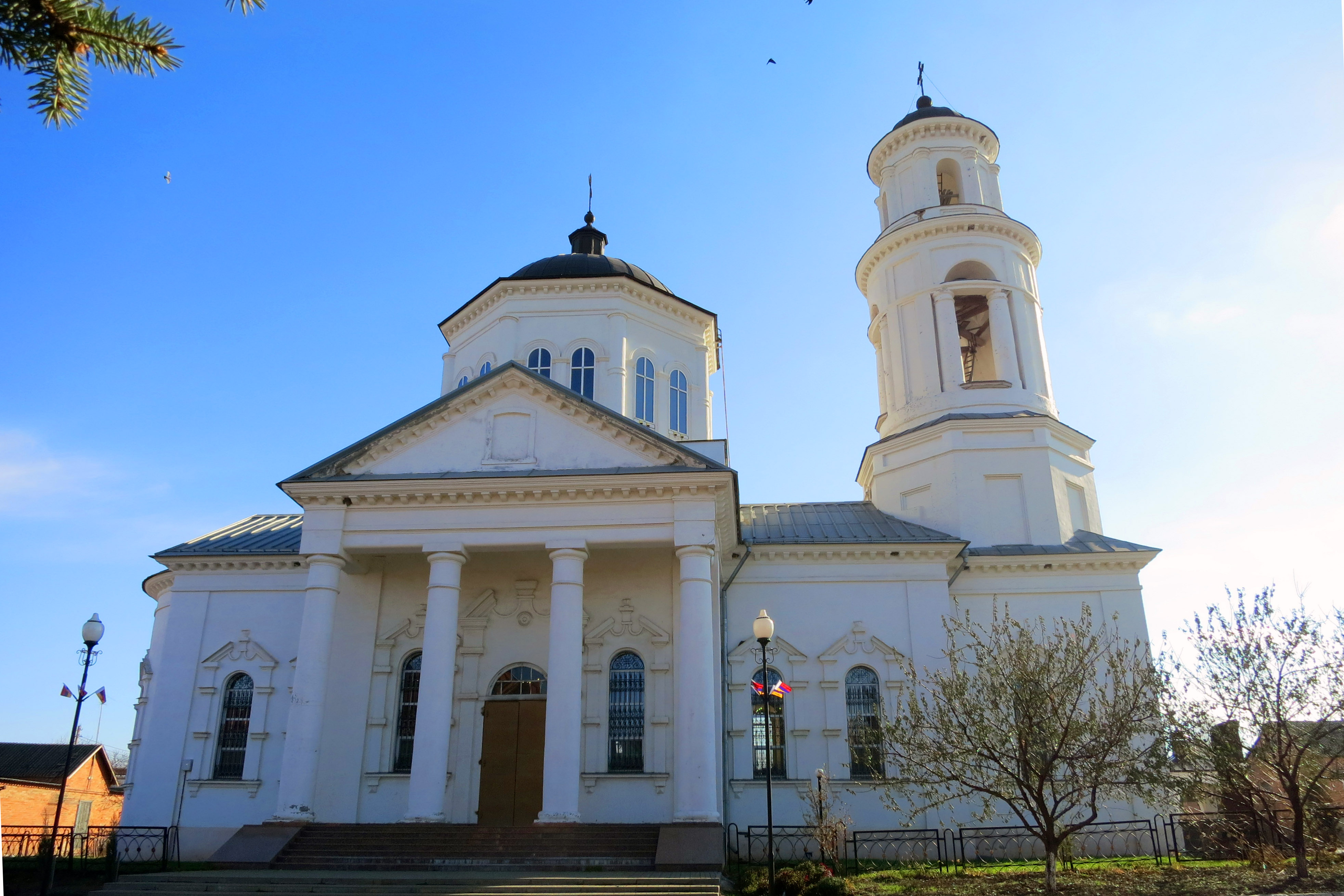
