= Church of John the Baptist (Nesvetay) =

Church in Rostov Oblast, Russia

Coordinates: 47.4552°N 39.6639°E

- Russian: Церковь Святого Иоанна Предтечи, Armenian: Սուրբ Կարապետ եկեղեցի
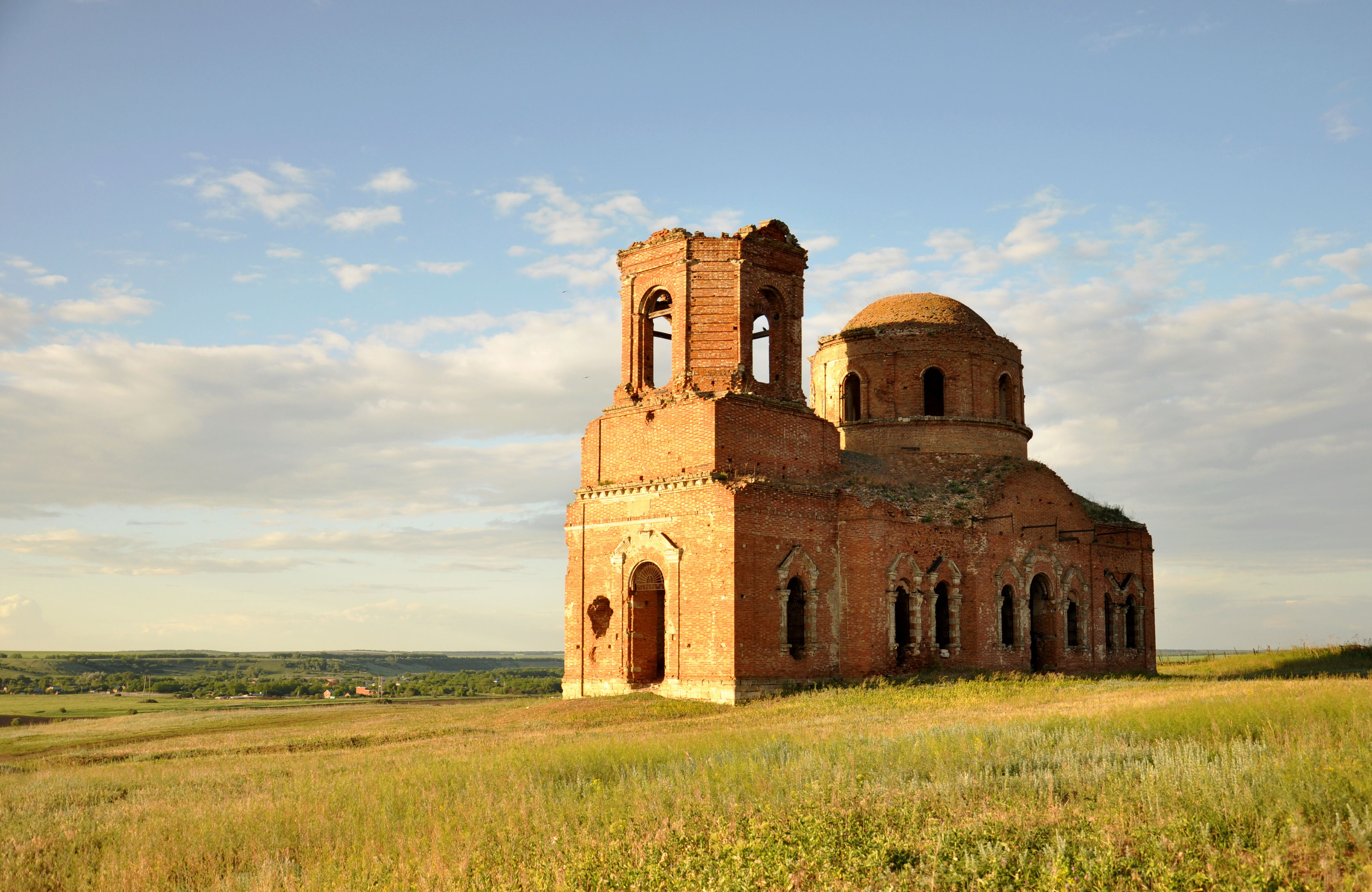

- Location within Rostov Oblast Location within Russia
- Location: Nesvetay village, Myasnikovsky District, Rostov Oblast, Russia
- Country: Russia
- Denomination: Armenian Apostolic Church

History
- Status: Parish church
- Dedication: John the Baptist

Architecture
- Functional status: closed
- Completed: 1870

Administration
- Diocese: Russia and New Nakhichevan

The Church of John the Baptist (Russian: Церковь Святого Иоанна Предтечи, Armenian: Սուրբ Կարապետ եկեղեցի) is an Armenian Apostolic church in Nesvetay village, Myasnikovsky District, Rostov Oblast, Russia. It is also officially declared as an architectural monument of regional significance of cultural heritage of Russia.

== History ==
Nesvetay village was founded in 1780, when thousands of Armenian families from Crimean peninsula were resettled in Don region on the decree of Catherine II. The Church of John the Baptist was first built here in 1790.

In 1837, one of Armenian merchants from Nakhichevan-on-Don petitioned to spiritual authorities to grant permission to build a new church in Nesvetay with his own funds, as the old had already been in dilipiated state. The permission was granted, and in spring of 1858 the construction was started. In 1866 the merchant, died and willed to finish construction of the church. In 1867, Nesvetay parishioners petitioned the build another church using the remaining materials, for the constricting one, in their opinion, was not built in the style of Armenian architecture and was not situated in the right place. Yet they were denied and construction of the church was finished in 1870.

In 1930s the church came into dilipiated state as no one could grant money for its reconstruction. The church was closed. During World War II the building was hit by shelling several times.

In 1992, the church building was officially declared as an architectural monument of regional significance of cultural heritage of Russia. Today it still requires a reconstruction.

== Literature ==
(in Russian)

- Вартанян В.Г., Казаров С.С. Армянская-Апостольская Церковь на Дону // Ростов н/Д., 2001 Е.И.
- Халпахчьян О.X. Архитектура Нахичевани-на-Дону // Ер. 1988
- Шахазиз Е. Новый Нахичеван и новонахичеванцы / Перевод с армянского Ш. М. Шагиняна // Ростов-на-Дону, 1999
- Российская и Ново-Нахичеванская епархия Армянской Апостольской Церкви. Исторический путь. М., 2013
