= Church of the Holy Mother of God, Bolshiye Saly =

Church in Rostov Oblast, Russia

Church of the Holy Mother of God
- Russian: Церковь Пресвятой Богородицы
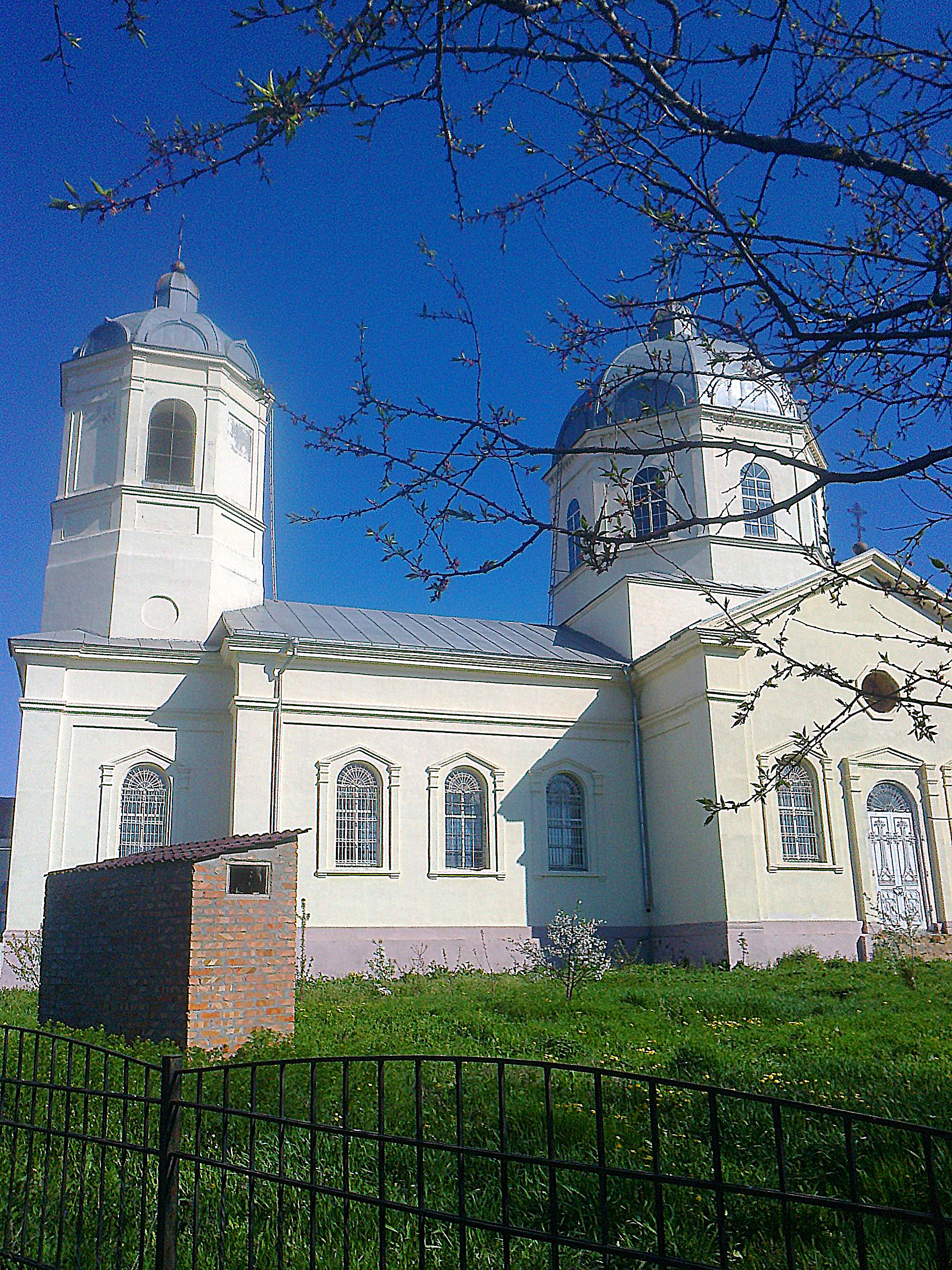
- Church of the Holy Mother of God
- Location: Bolshiye Saly village, Myasnikovsky District, Rostov Oblast, Russia
- Country: Russia
- Denomination: Armenian Apostolic Church

History
- Status: Parish church
- Dedication: Holy Mother of God

Administration
- Diocese: Russia and New Nakhichevan

The Church of the Holy Mother of God (Russian: Церковь Пресвятой Богородицы) is an Armenian Apostolic church in Bolshiye Saly village, Myasnikovsky District, Rostov Oblast, Russia. It is also officially declared as an architectural monument of regional significance of cultural heritage of Russia.

== History ==
In 1848 the believers of Bolshiye Saly, many of whom were Armenians, decided to build a brick church. In 1860, its construction began and was finished and consecrated by Catholicos George IV 7 years later. It was built on the project of Taganrog architect N. Muratov.

In 1938 the church was closed and its property was sold. During World War II, the church building was damaged and later was turned into a granary.

From 2001 to 2008, the church was being renovated. In 2008 it was consecrated again by Catholicos Karekin II. In 2011, a memorial cross was erected in honor of church clergy who fell victims to Soviet repressions.

== Architecture ==
A special feature of the church architecture is the absence of porticoes in front of the northern and southern facades, as well as at the eastern facade of the altar apse. Instead of porticoes, in the wall of this part, there are arranged three exedras, with the middle one serving as an altar.

== Gallery ==
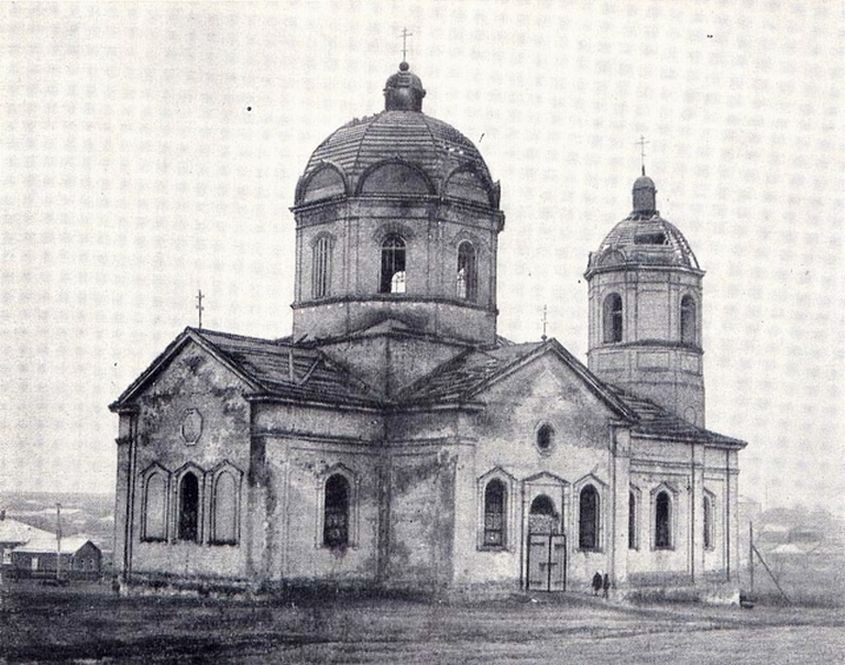
The picture of the church taken in between 1925 and 1941

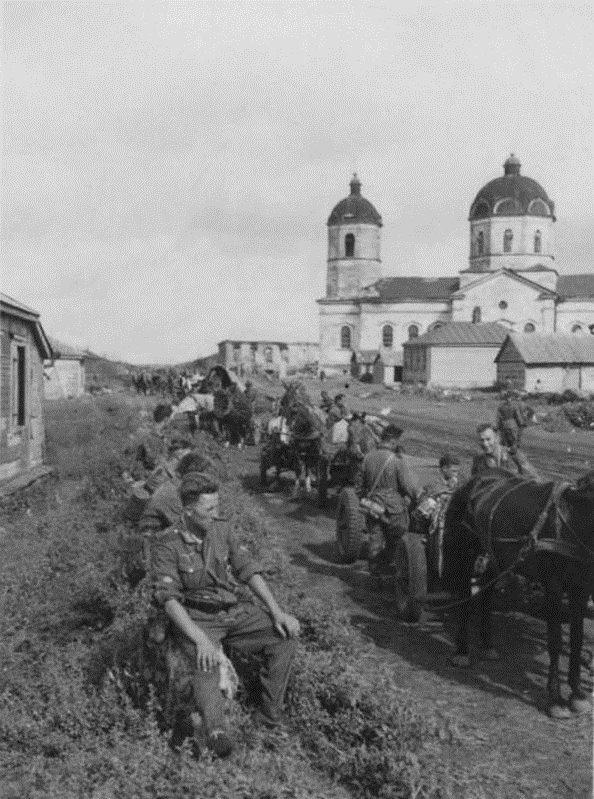
A picture taken during German occupation of the village in 1942

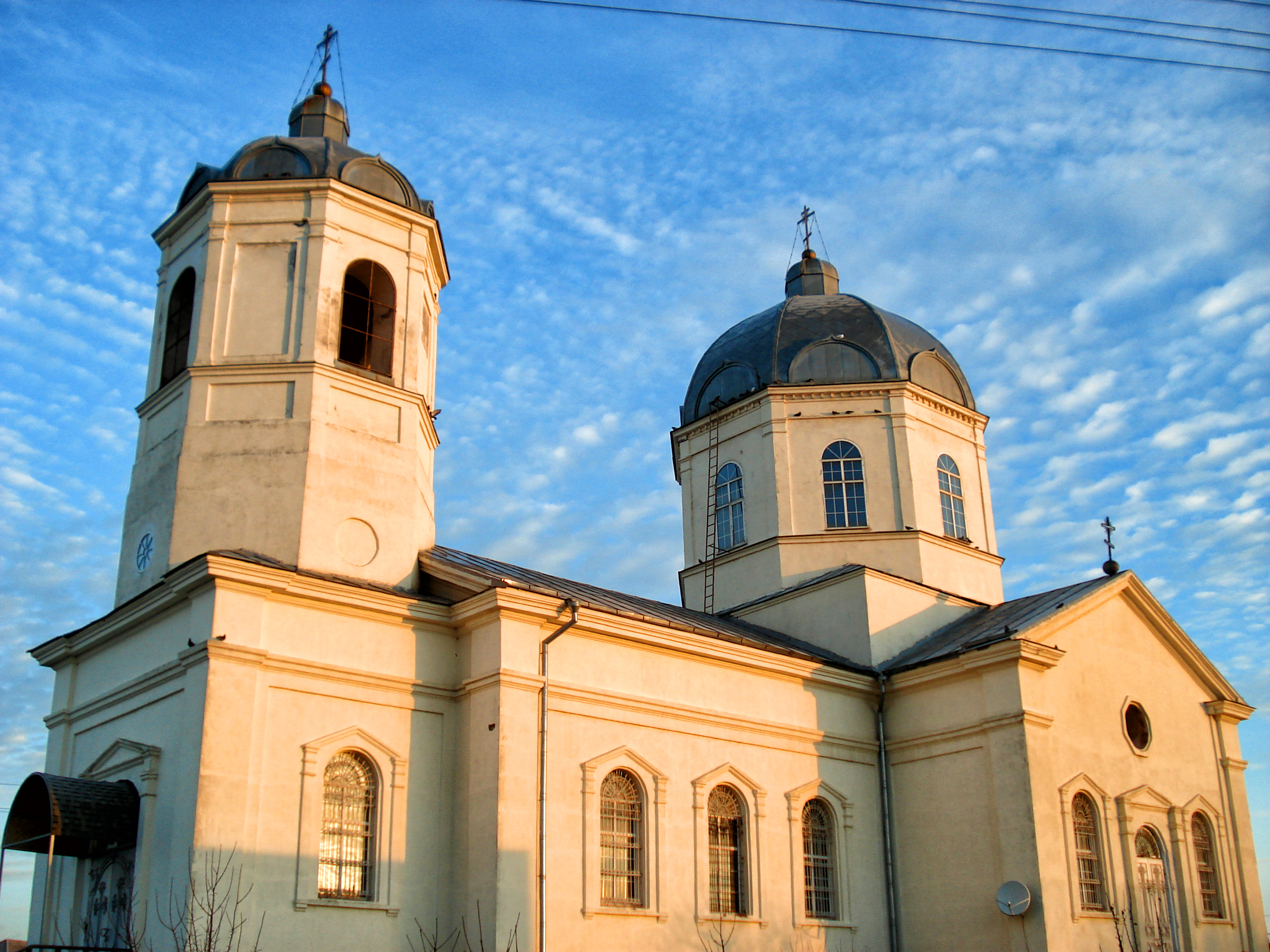
Church of the Holy Mother of God in 2016

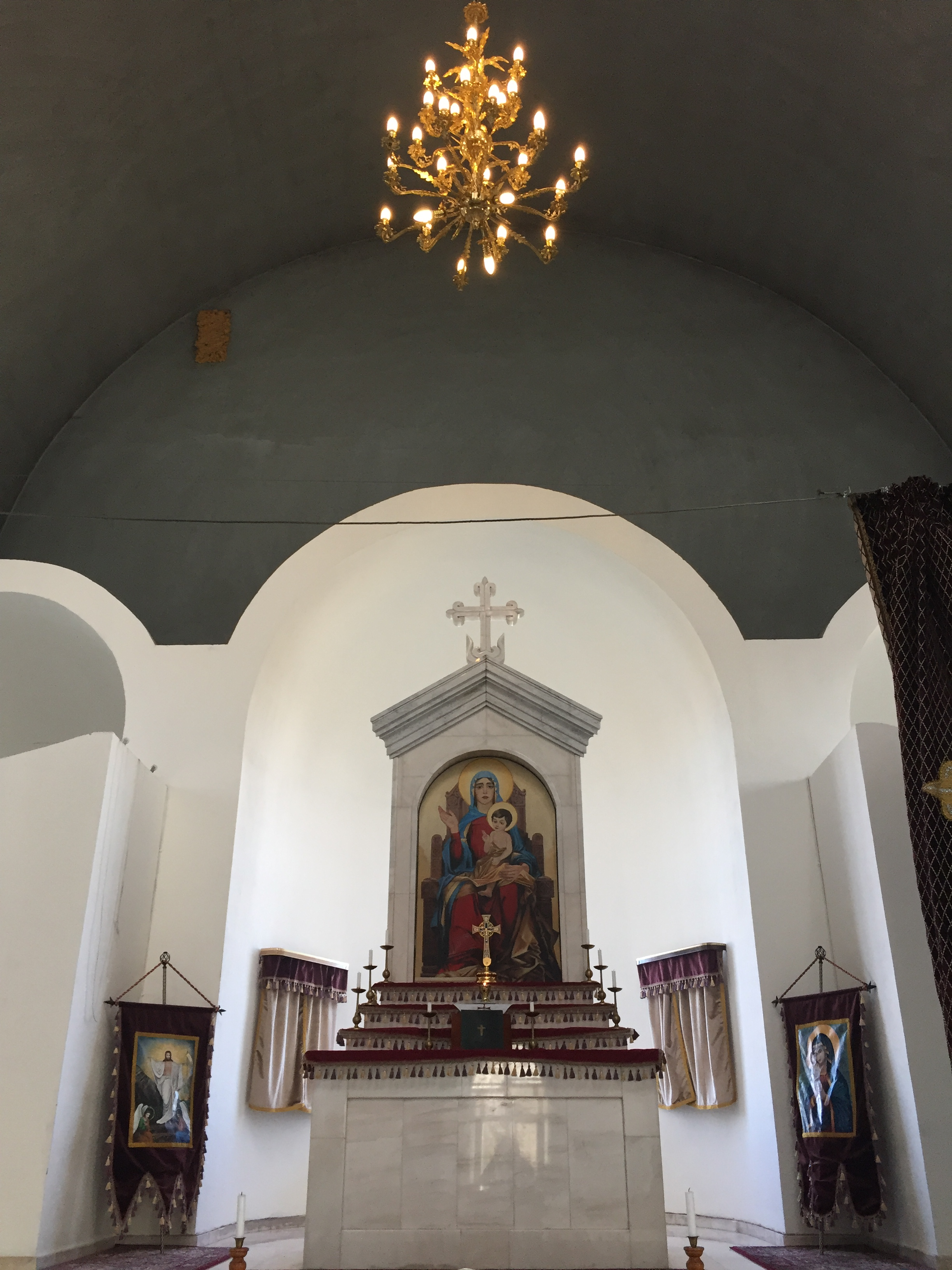
Inside the church in 2019
