= Powder Cellar Museum =

Museum and historic building in Azov, Rostov, Russia

Coordinates: 47°06′59″N 39°25′09″E

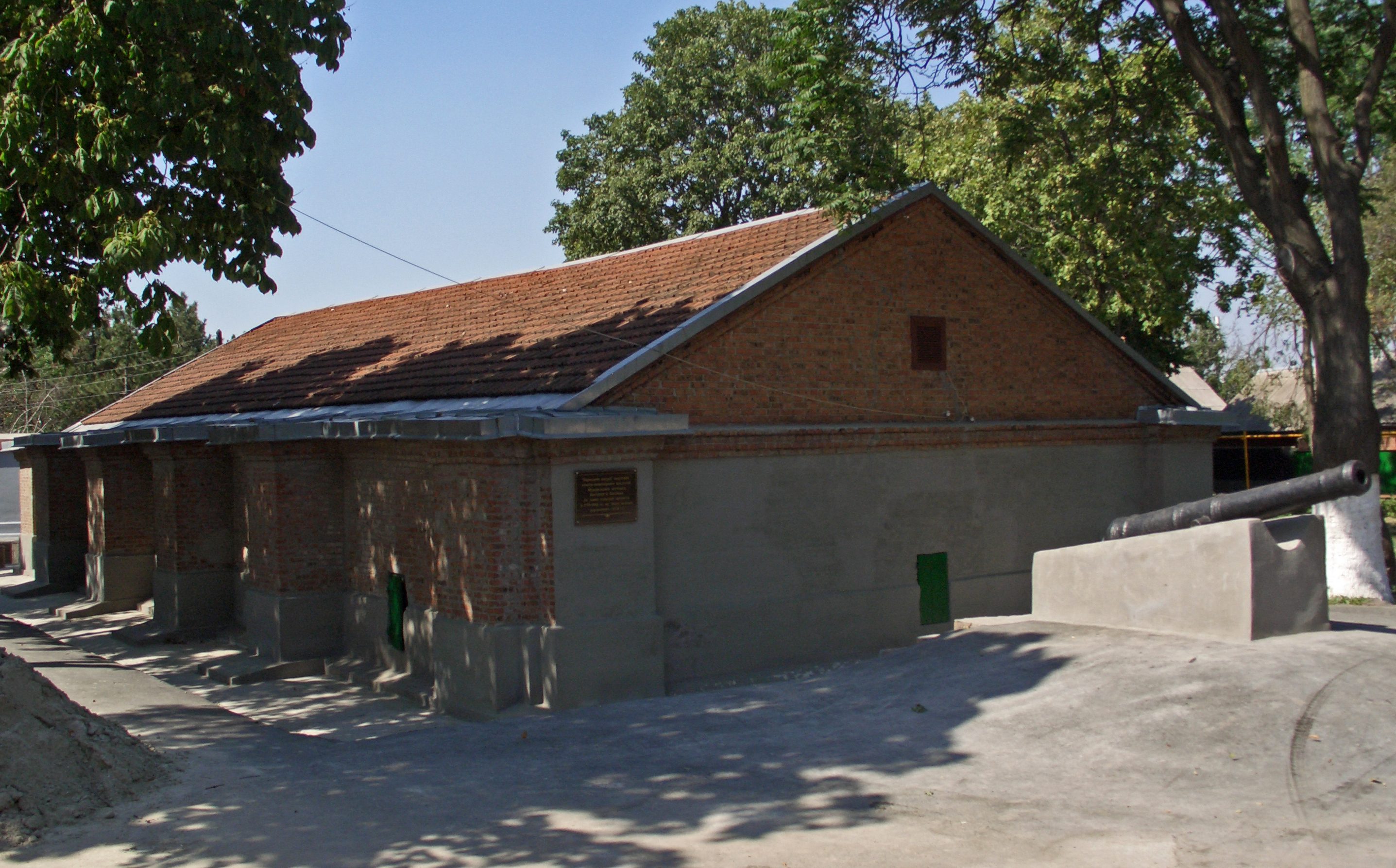
The Powder Cellar Museum

The Powder Cellar Museum is a museum in the city of Azov, Rostov Oblast, Russia. It is a branch of the Azov Museum of History, Archaeology and Palaeontology. The place it occupies was recognized as a cultural monument of federal significance of Russian Federation.

== History ==
The first powder cellar in Azov, a wooden building for the storage of gunpowder, was built in 1770. Inside the cellar were made bunks, where barrels of gunpowder were kept. The wooden cellar was disassembled in 1797 after falling into a dilapidated state. Since 1810, Azov Fortress has gradually declined. In the 19th century, the cellar was covered with earth up to the roof.

In the nineteenth and early twentieth centuries the powder cellar was used to store ice and other goods in summer.

The Powder Cellar Museum was opened in Azov in 1967.

In 2014, Suvorov Monument was installed on the territory of the museum.

== Gallery ==
Museum exhibition

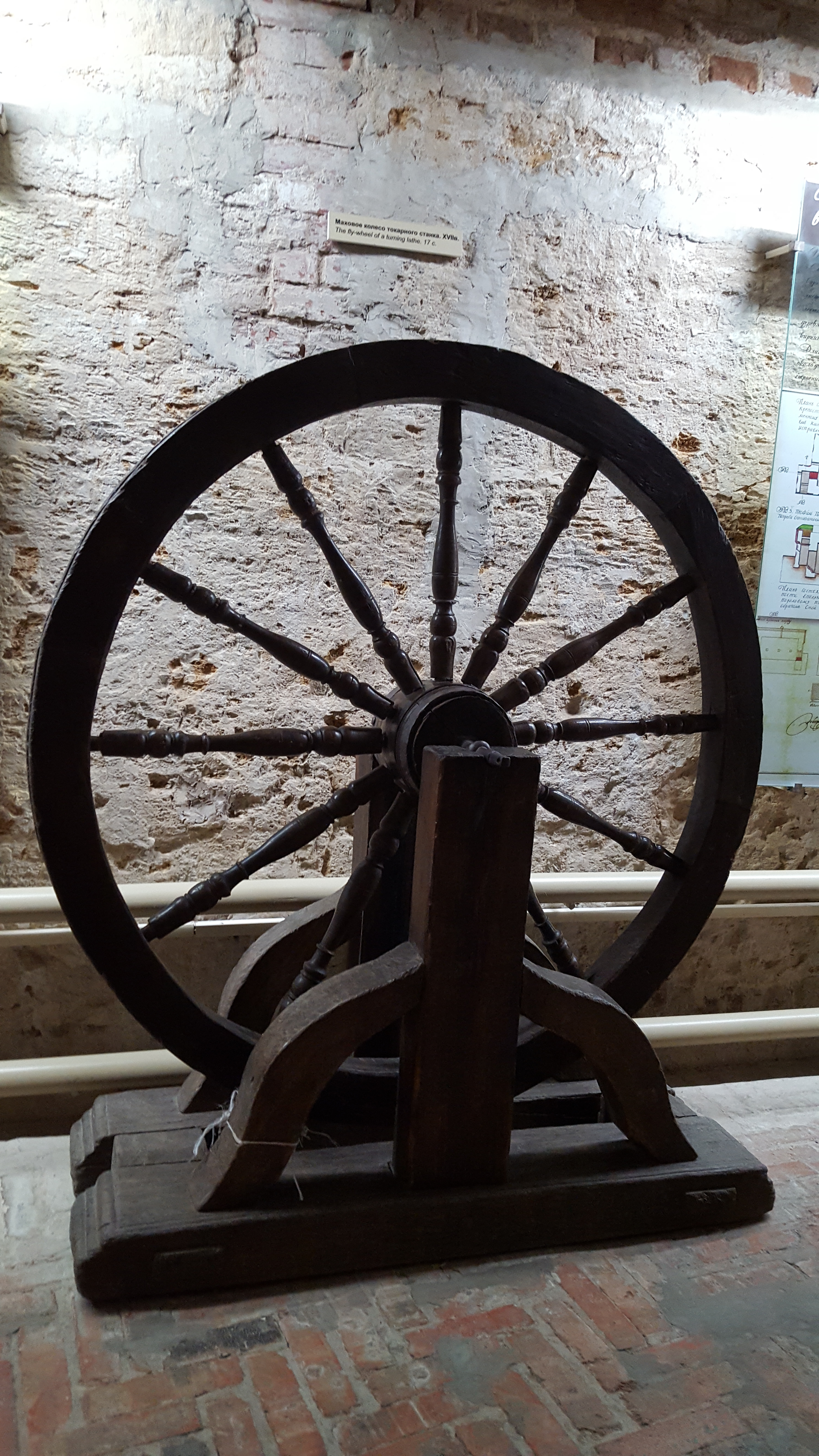
Flywheel of the lathe, 17th century

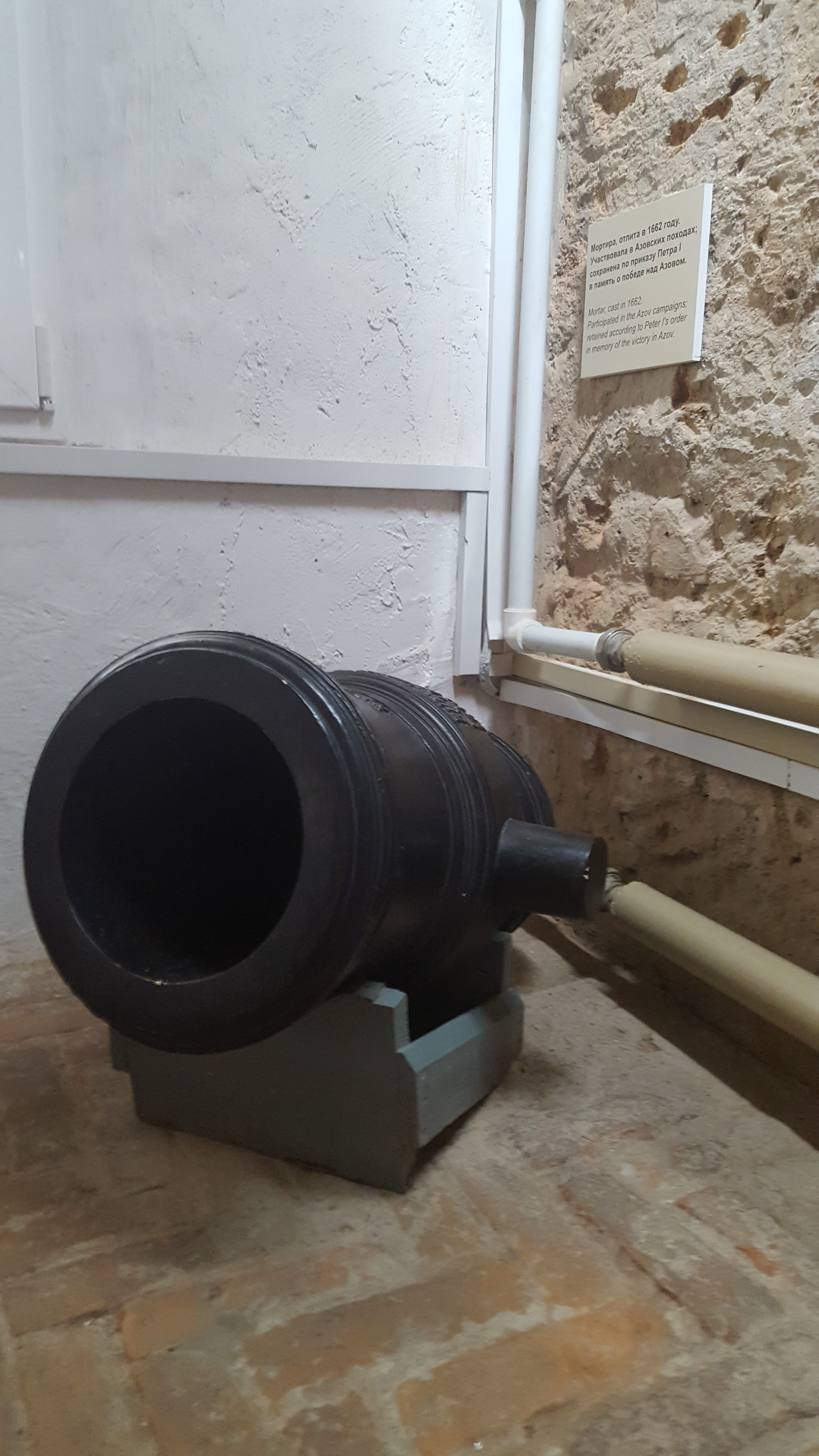
Mortar used during the Azov campaigns

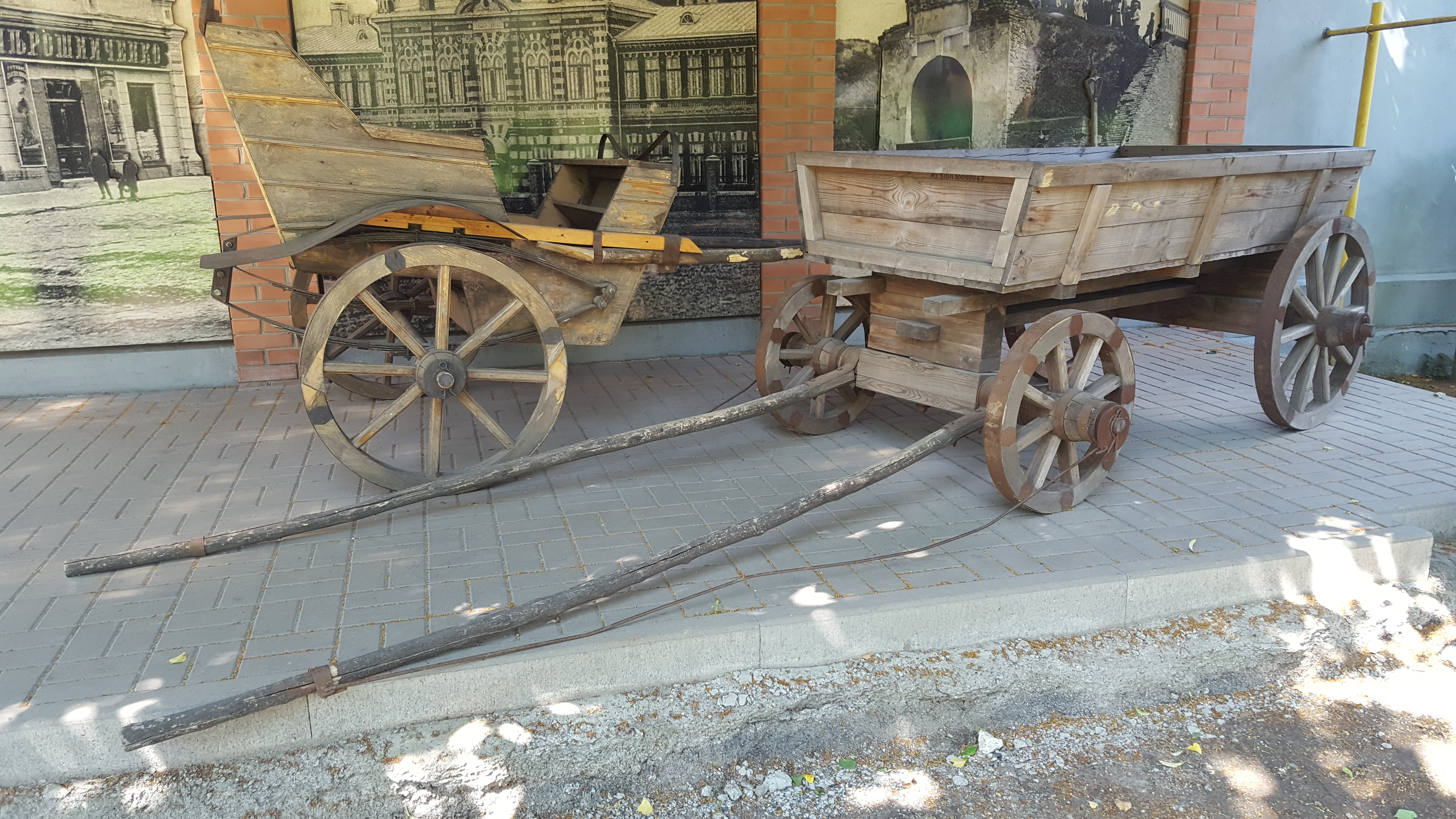
