= Bolshiye Saly =

Bolshiye Saly Большие Салы
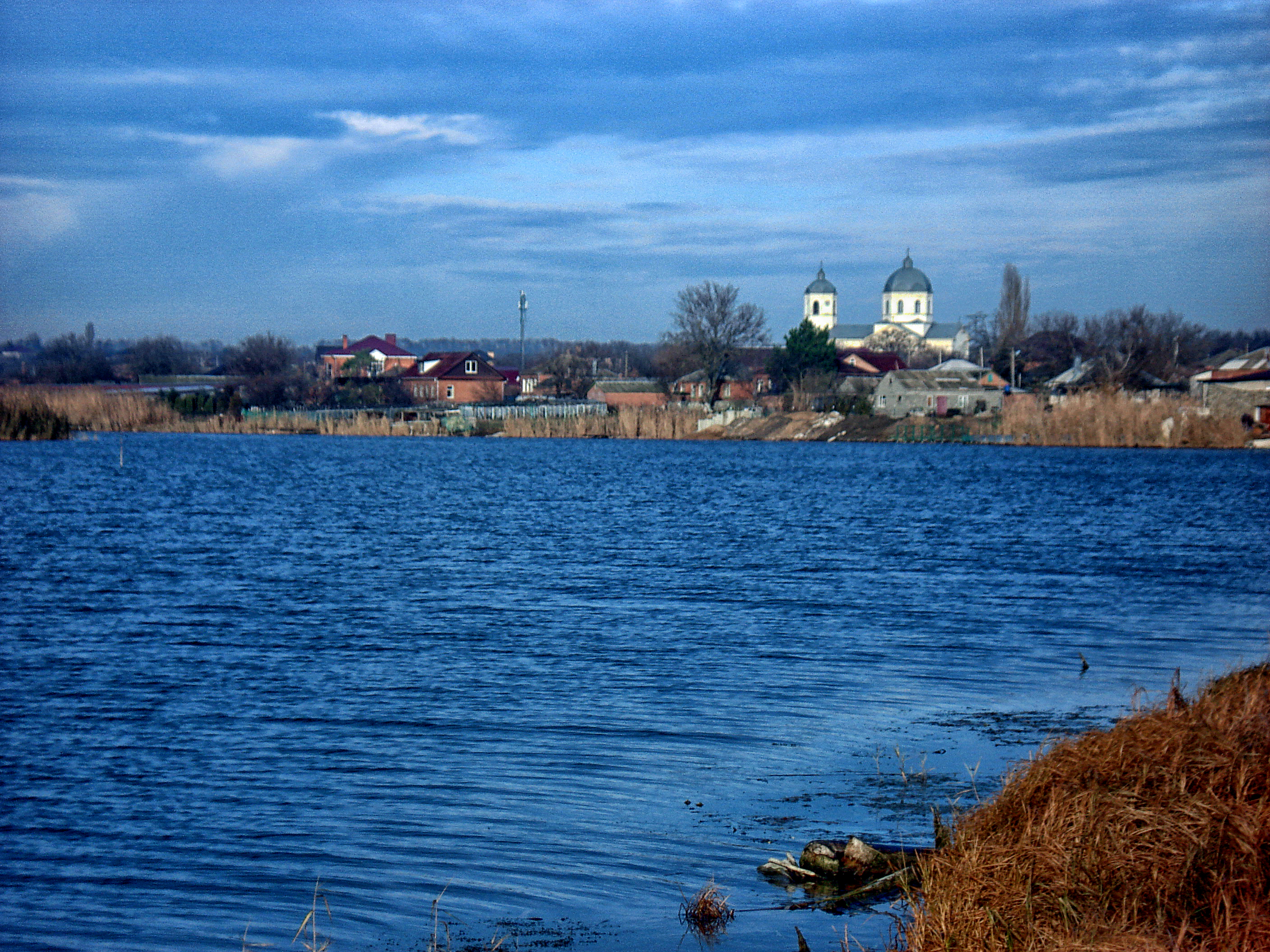
- Interactive map of Bolshiye Saly
- Location of Bolshiye Saly Bolshiye Saly (Rostov Oblast)
- Coordinates: 47°23′25″N 39°41′07″E
- Country: Russia
- Federal subject: Rostov Oblast
- Founded: 1779

Population
  - Estimate (2010): 3,483 )

Municipal status
  - Municipal district: Myasnikovsky
  - Rural settlement: Bolshesalskoye
- Time zone: UTC+3 (MSK)
- Postal code: 346816
- Dialing code: +7 86349
- OKTMO ID: 60635405101

Bolshiye Saly or Greater Sala (Russian: Большие Салы, Armenian: Մեծ Սալա, romanized: Mets Sala) is a rural locality (selo) in Myasnikovsky District, Rostov Oblast, Russia.

== History ==
Bolshiye Saly was founded in 1779 by Armenians who were resettled from Crimea by the decree of Catherine II. The founders of Bolshiye Saly moved from the Crimean village of Sala (now Hrushivka).

According to oral tradition, the Armenian settlers originally chose the right bank of the Tuzlov River, near the current village of Nesvetay, as the site for their settlement. Soon after they settled there, a girl drowned in the river, after which the villagers decided to move to a place near the source of the shallow river Temernik, which was closer to the drinking springs. The Armenian Church of the Holy Mother of God was built in this area between 1860 and 1867. It was closed in Soviet times and reconsecrated in 2008 after renovation.

A native of the village named Mariam Kundupyan (Kirpiyan) was the inspiration for one of the heroines of Anton Chekhov's story "The Beauties." Simon Vratsyan, a prominent Armenian politician who grew up in the village in the 1880s and '90s, describes it in his memoirs as the wealthiest and most developed village in its district. At the time, the two main neighborhoods of the village were joined by two wooden bridges across the Temernik River. At the beginning of the 20th century, two stone bridges were built on the river. During World War II, they were destroyed by the Germans, but the foundations of the bridges remained.

== Economy ==
The inhabitants of the village mainly grow cereals and keep livestock and poultry. The village has a secondary school, a house of culture and a hospital.
