= Chaltyr =

Chaltyr Чалтырь
- Selo
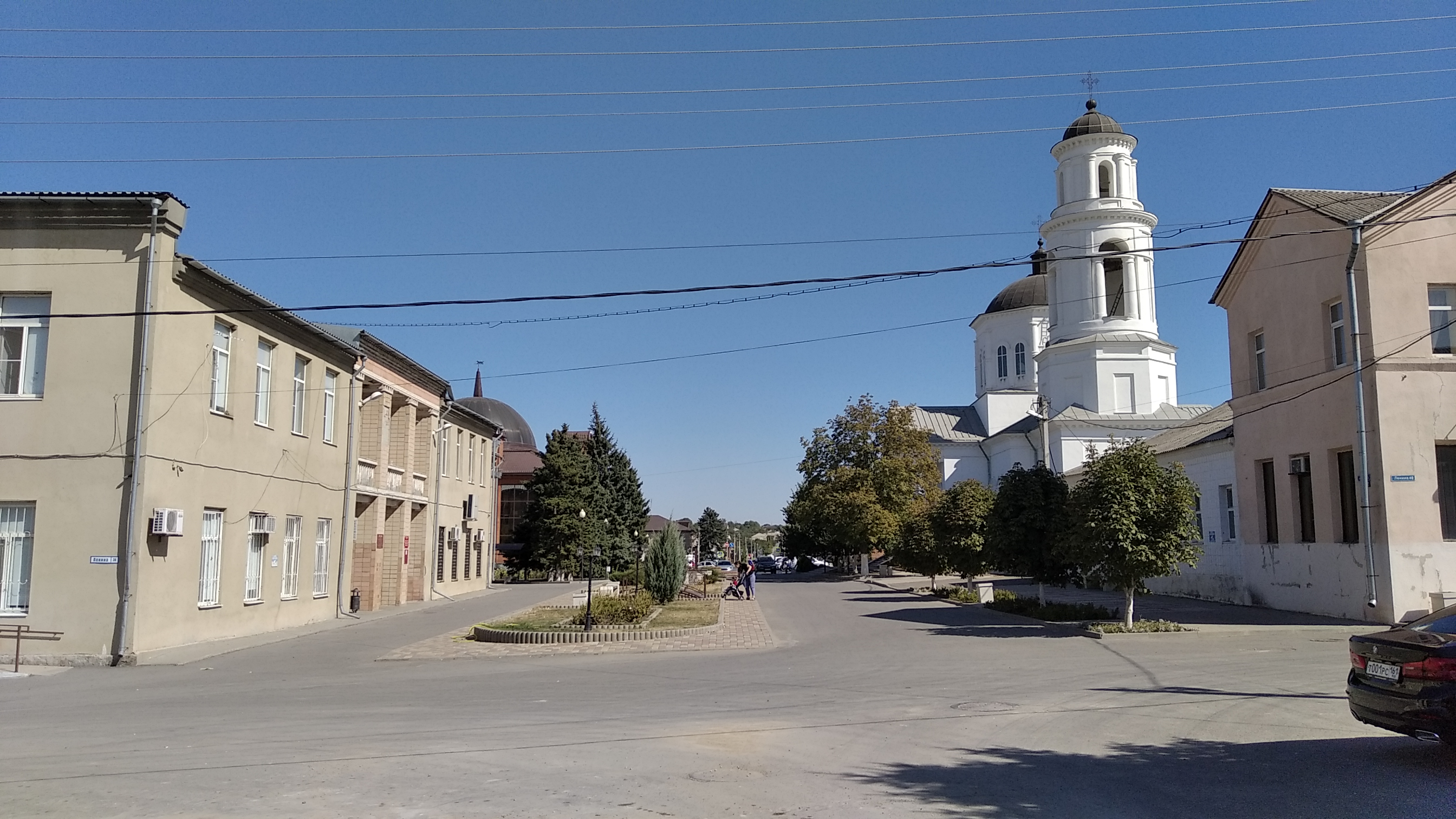
- Central part

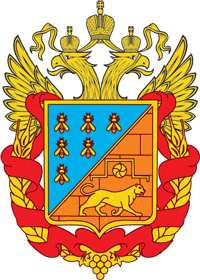
- Flag Coat of arms
- Interactive map of Chaltyr
- Location of Chaltyr Chaltyr (Rostov Oblast)
- Coordinates: 47°17′N 39°30′E
- Country: Russia
- Federal subject: Rostov Oblast
- Administrative district: Myasnikovsky District
- Founded: 1779

Population (2010 Census)
  - Total: 13,400
  - Estimate (2010): 15,334 (+14.4%)
- Time zone: UTC+3 (MSK)
- Postal codes: 346800, 346801, 346802, 346803
- OKTMO ID: 60635452101

Chaltyr (Russian: Чалтырь, Armenian: Չալթր) is a rural locality (a selo) in Myasnikovsky District of Rostov Oblast, Russia. Population: nearly 17,000. It is also the administrative center of Myasnikovsky District and the largest settlement in the district.

== Geography ==
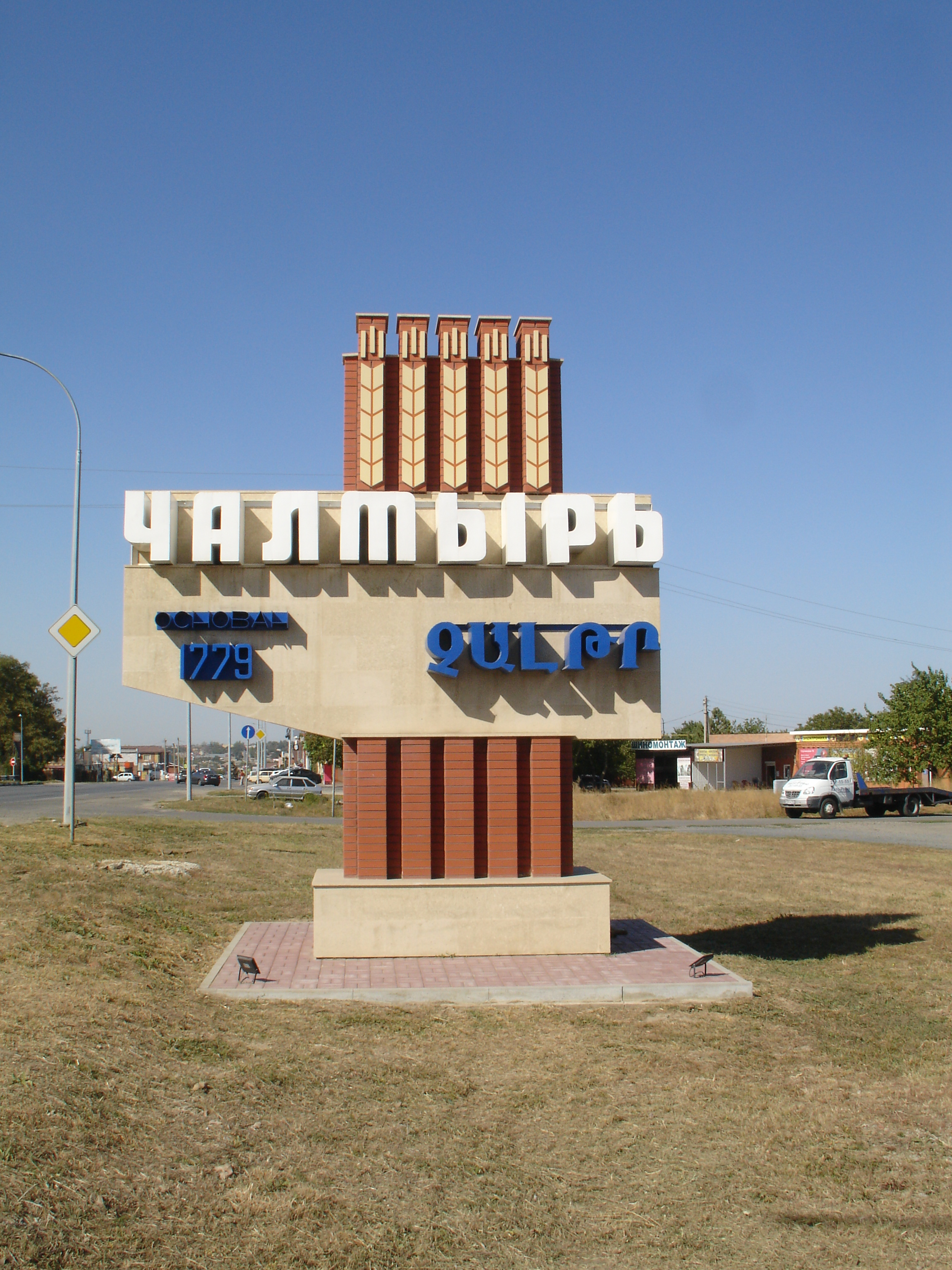
Entrance sign

Chaltyr is situated 11 km west of Rostov-on-Don. The village of Crimea (with 4,5 thousand inhabitants) directly adjoins Chaltyr from the north. Rivers Mokry Chaltyr and Khavaly flow through the settlement.

== History ==
Chaltyr was founded in 1779 by Armenian settlers from the Crimea peninsula, whose real birthplace was the capital of medieval Armenia, the city of Ani. They speak the Nor-Nakhichevan (or Don, Crimean-Ani) dialect of Western Armenian language. Don Armenians still constitute a large part of the population of Chaltyr village and other settlements of Myasnikovsky District. The Church of the Ascension was founded in 1790.

In the years 1869 ― 1870, the railroad of Taganrog-Rostov line was being constructed through Mokry Chaltyr khutor. It was built and later maintained also by the local population.

At the end of the XIX century, the peasants of Chaltyr village invented a new kind of strong, spring wheat that was called "Chaltyrskaya".

== Places of interest ==
- Church of the Ascension (Chaltyr), an Armenian Apostolic church built in the 19th century.
- Glory Memorial, a memorial to Soviet soldiers who died in World War II
- Museum of local history and ethnography
- Chatal-Oba Mounds
