= Myasnikovsky District =

Myasnikovsky District Мясниковский район (Russian)
- District
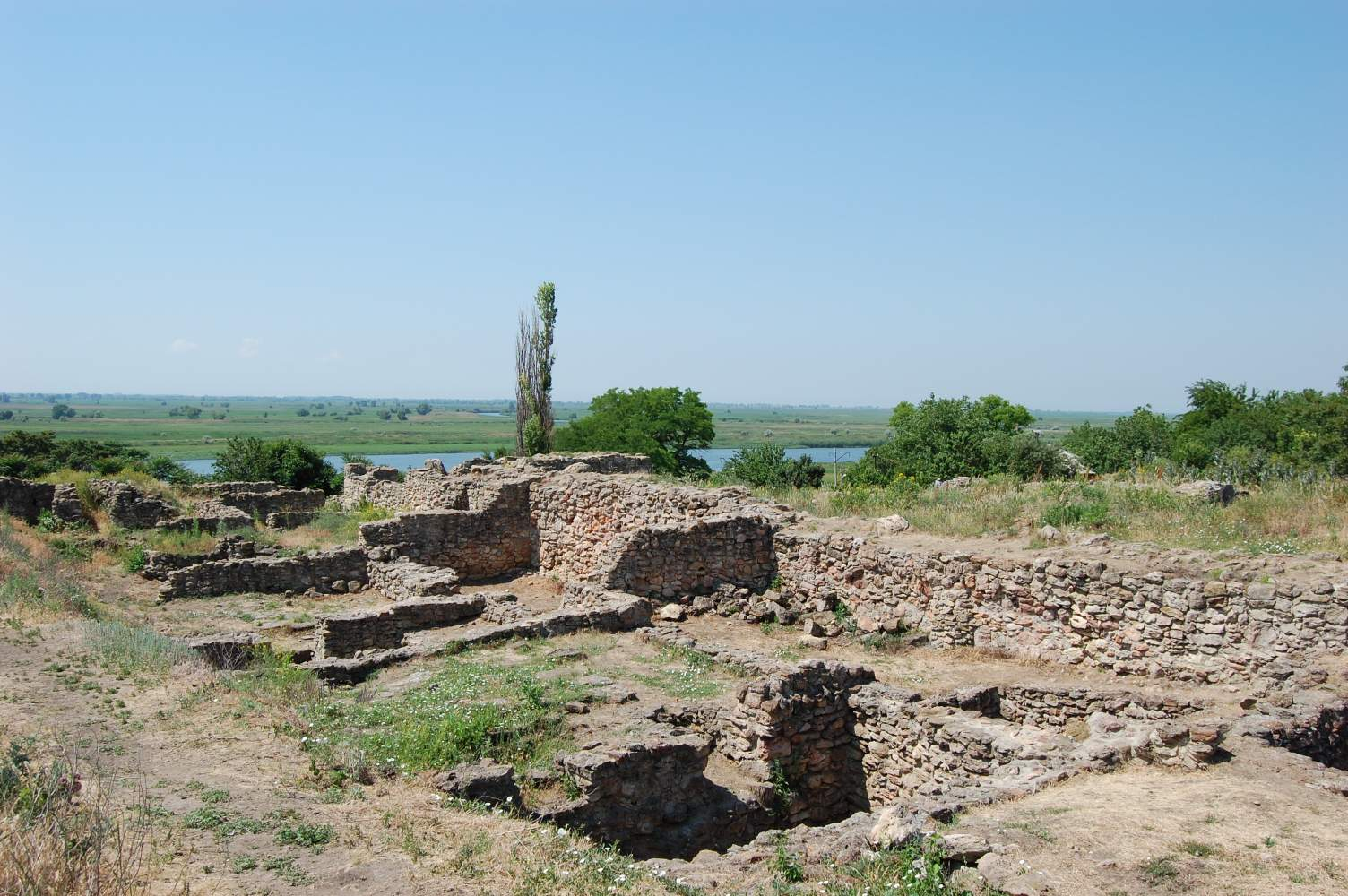
- Tanais excavation in Myasnikovsky District

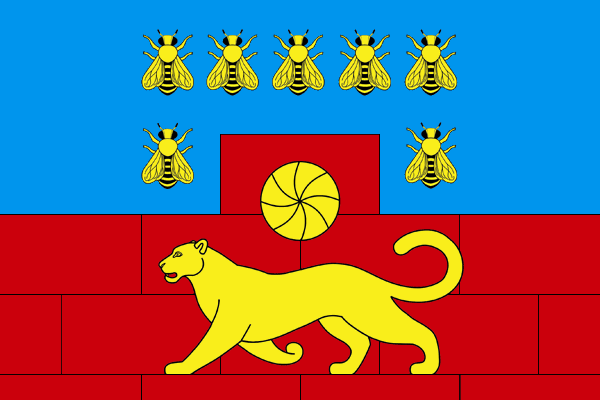
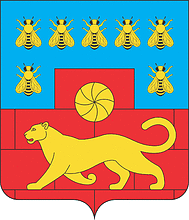
- Flag Coat of arms
- Location of Myasnikovsky District in Rostov Oblast
- Coordinates: 47°17′N 39°30′E
- Country: Russia
- Federal subject: Rostov Oblast
- Established: 10 May 1926
- Administrative center: Chaltyr

Area
  - Total: 880 km^{2} (340 sq mi)

Population (2010 Census)
  - Total: 39,631
  - Density: 45/km^{2} (120/sq mi)
  - Urban: 0%
  - Rural: 100%

Administrative structure
  - Administrative divisions: 7 rural settlement
  - Inhabited localities: 23 rural localities

Municipal structure
  - Municipally incorporated as: Myasnikovsky Municipal District
  - Municipal divisions: 0 urban settlements, 7 rural settlements
- Time zone: UTC+3 (MSK)
- OKTMO ID: 60635000
- Website: http://www.amrro.ru/

Myasnikovsky District (Russian: Мяснико́вский райо́н) is an administrative and municipal district (raion), one of the forty-three in Rostov Oblast, Russia. It is located in the west of the oblast. The area of the district is 880 square kilometers (340 sq mi). Its administrative center is the rural locality (a selo) of Chaltyr. Population: 39,631 (2010 Census); 37,690 (2002 census); 32,393 (1989 Soviet census). The population of Chaltyr accounts for 38.7% of the district's total population. The historical ethnic Armenian community constitutes majority of the population of the district, about 60 percent.

== See also ==
- Armenians in Russia
- List of Armenian ethnic enclaves
