= Ozerki (rural locality) =

Ozerki (Russian: Озерки) or Ozyorki (Озёрки) is the name of several rural localities in Russia.

== Modern localities ==
=== Altai Krai ===
As of 2010, four rural localities in Altai Krai bear this name:

- Ozerki, Charyshsky District, Altai Krai, a selo in Alekseyevsky Selsoviet of Charyshsky District
- Ozerki, Shipunovsky District, Altai Krai, a settlement in Yeltsovsky Selsoviet of Shipunovsky District
- Ozyorki, Novoozersky Selsoviet, Talmensky District, Altai Krai, a station in Novoozersky Selsoviet of Talmensky District
- Ozyorki, Ozersky Selsoviet, Talmensky District, Altai Krai, a selo in Ozersky Selsoviet of Talmensky District

=== Republic of Bashkortostan ===
As of 2010, three rural localities in the Republic of Bashkortostan bear this name:

- Ozerki, Karaidelsky District, Republic of Bashkortostan, a village in Ozerkinsky Selsoviet of Karaidelsky District
- Ozerki, Meleuzovsky District, Republic of Bashkortostan, a village in Shevchenkovsky Selsoviet of Meleuzovsky District
- Ozerki, Mishkinsky District, Republic of Bashkortostan, a village in Staroarzamatovsky Selsoviet of Mishkinsky District

=== Belgorod Oblast ===
As of 2010, one rural locality in Belgorod Oblast bears this name:

- Ozerki, Belgorod Oblast, a selo in Starooskolsky District

=== Kaliningrad Oblast ===
As of 2010, three rural localities in Kaliningrad Oblast bear this name:

- Ozerki, Gvardeysky District, Kaliningrad Oblast, a settlement in Ozerkovsky Rural Okrug of Gvardeysky District
- Ozerki, Nesterovsky District, Kaliningrad Oblast, a settlement in Chistoprudnensky Rural Okrug of Nesterovsky District
- Ozerki, Pravdinsky District, Kaliningrad Oblast, a settlement under the administrative jurisdiction of the urban-type settlement of district significance of Zheleznodorozhny, Pravdinsky District

=== Kaluga Oblast ===
As of 2010, one rural locality in Kaluga Oblast bears this name:

- Ozerki, Kaluga Oblast, a village in Yukhnovsky District

=== Kemerovo Oblast ===
As of 2010, one rural locality in Kemerovo Oblast bears this name:

- Ozerki, Kemerovo Oblast, a village in Padunskaya Rural Territory of Promyshlennovsky District

=== Kirov Oblast ===
As of 2010, one rural locality in Kirov Oblast bears this name:

- Ozerki, Kirov Oblast, a village in Podgorodny Rural Okrug of Orlovsky District

=== Kostroma Oblast ===
As of 2010, one rural locality in Kostroma Oblast bears this name:

- Ozerki, Kostroma Oblast, a village in Chukhlomskoye Settlement of Chukhlomsky District

=== Kurgan Oblast ===
As of 2010, one rural locality in Kurgan Oblast bears this name:

- Ozerki, Kurgan Oblast, a village in Korovinsky Selsoviet of Mishkinsky District

=== Kursk Oblast ===
As of 2010, seven rural localities in Kursk Oblast bear this name:

- Ozerki, Belovsky District, Kursk Oblast, a selo in Ozerkovsky Selsoviet of Belovsky District
- Ozerki, Fatezhsky District, Kursk Oblast, a village in Verkhnekhotemlsky Selsoviet of Fatezhsky District
- Ozerki, Kastorensky District, Kursk Oblast, a village in Azarovsky Selsoviet of Kastorensky District
- Ozerki, Oktyabrsky District, Kursk Oblast, a village in Artyukhovsky Selsoviet of Oktyabrsky District
- Ozerki, Pristensky District, Kursk Oblast, a khutor in Kolbasovsky Selsoviet of Pristensky District
- Ozerki, Shchigrovsky District, Kursk Oblast, a village in Ozersky Selsoviet of Shchigrovsky District
- Ozerki, Zheleznogorsky District, Kursk Oblast, a settlement in Volkovsky Selsoviet of Zheleznogorsky District

=== Leningrad Oblast ===
As of 2010, three rural localities in Leningrad Oblast bear this name:

- Ozerki, Vsevolozhsky District, Leningrad Oblast, a village in Razmetelevskoye Settlement Municipal Formation of Vsevolozhsky District
- Ozerki, Pervomayskoye Settlement Municipal Formation, Vyborgsky District, Leningrad Oblast, a logging depot settlement in Pervomayskoye Settlement Municipal Formation of Vyborgsky District
- Ozerki, Primorskoye Settlement Municipal Formation, Vyborgsky District, Leningrad Oblast, a logging depot settlement under the administrative jurisdiction of Primorskoye Settlement Municipal Formation of Vyborgsky District

=== Lipetsk Oblast ===
As of 2010, six rural localities in Lipetsk Oblast bear this name:

- Ozerki, Dolgorukovsky District, Lipetsk Oblast, a village in Zhernovsky Selsoviet of Dolgorukovsky District
- Ozerki, Lev-Tolstovsky District, Lipetsk Oblast, a village in Novochemodanovsky Selsoviet of Lev-Tolstovsky District
- Ozerki, Ognevsky Selsoviet, Stanovlyansky District, Lipetsk Oblast, a village in Ognevsky Selsoviet of Stanovlyansky District
- Ozerki, Petrishchevsky Selsoviet, Stanovlyansky District, Lipetsk Oblast, a village in Petrishchevsky Selsoviet of Stanovlyansky District
- Ozerki, Terbunsky District, Lipetsk Oblast, a selo in Ozersky Selsoviet of Terbunsky District
- Ozerki, Usmansky District, Lipetsk Oblast, a village in Bereznyagovsky Selsoviet of Usmansky District

=== Mari El Republic ===
As of 2010, three rural localities in the Mari El Republic bear this name:

- Ozerki, Gornomariysky District, Mari El Republic, a village in Ozerkinsky Rural Okrug of Gornomariysky District
- Ozerki, Kilemarsky District, Mari El Republic, a village in Ardinsky Rural Okrug of Kilemarsky District
- Ozerki, Zvenigovsky District, Mari El Republic, a village under the administrative jurisdiction of the urban-type settlement of Krasnogorsky, Zvenigovsky District

=== Republic of Mordovia ===
As of 2010, two rural localities in the Republic of Mordovia bear this name:

- Ozerki, Atyuryevsky District, Republic of Mordovia, a settlement in Dmitriyevo-Usadsky Selsoviet of Atyuryevsky District
- Ozerki, Ruzayevsky District, Republic of Mordovia, a village in Palayevsky Selsoviet of Ruzayevsky District

=== Moscow Oblast ===
As of 2010, two rural localities in Moscow Oblast bear this name:

- Ozerki, Serebryano-Prudsky District, Moscow Oblast, a village in Mochilskoye Rural Settlement of Serebryano-Prudsky District
- Ozerki, Zaraysky District, Moscow Oblast, a village in Strupnenskoye Rural Settlement of Zaraysky District

=== Nizhny Novgorod Oblast ===
As of 2010, seven rural localities in Nizhny Novgorod Oblast bear this name:

- Ozerki, Bor, Nizhny Novgorod Oblast, a village in Krasnoslobodsky Selsoviet of the city of oblast significance of Bor
- Ozerki, Semyonov, Nizhny Novgorod Oblast, a village in Bokovskoy Selsoviet of the city of oblast significance of Semyonov
- Ozerki, Arzamassky District, Nizhny Novgorod Oblast, a village in Berezovsky Selsoviet of Arzamassky District
- Ozerki, Knyagininsky District, Nizhny Novgorod Oblast, a village in Vozrozhdensky Selsoviet of Knyagininsky District
- Ozerki, Pilninsky District, Nizhny Novgorod Oblast, a selo in Yazykovsky Selsoviet of Pilninsky District
- Ozerki, Shatkovsky District, Nizhny Novgorod Oblast, a selo in Krasnoborsky Selsoviet of Shatkovsky District
- Ozerki, Sosnovsky District, Nizhny Novgorod Oblast, a village in Paninsky Selsoviet of Sosnovsky District

=== Novgorod Oblast ===
As of 2010, four rural localities in Novgorod Oblast bear this name:

- Ozerki, Novorakhinskoye Settlement, Krestetsky District, Novgorod Oblast, a village in Novorakhinskoye Settlement of Krestetsky District
- Ozerki, Zaytsevskoye Settlement, Krestetsky District, Novgorod Oblast, a village in Zaytsevskoye Settlement of Krestetsky District
- Ozerki, Okulovsky District, Novgorod Oblast, a village under the administrative jurisdiction of the urban-type settlement of Uglovka, Okulovsky District
- Ozerki, Poddorsky District, Novgorod Oblast, a village in Poddorskoye Settlement of Poddorsky District

=== Novosibirsk Oblast ===
As of 2010, one rural locality in Novosibirsk Oblast bears this name:

- Ozerki, Novosibirsk Oblast, a settlement in Iskitimsky District

=== Orenburg Oblast ===
As of 2010, two rural localities in Orenburg Oblast bear this name:

- Ozerki, Ileksky District, Orenburg Oblast, a selo in Ozersky Selsoviet of Ileksky District
- Ozerki, Kurmanayevsky District, Orenburg Oblast, a selo in Labazinsky Selsoviet of Kurmanayevsky District

=== Oryol Oblast ===
As of 2010, six rural localities in Oryol Oblast bear this name:

- Ozerki, Dmitrovsky District, Oryol Oblast, a settlement in Dolbenkinsky Selsoviet of Dmitrovsky District
- Ozerki, Dolzhansky District, Oryol Oblast, a village in Uspensky Selsoviet of Dolzhansky District
- Ozerki, Glazunovsky District, Oryol Oblast, a village in Senkovsky Selsoviet of Glazunovsky District
- Ozerki, Orlovsky District, Oryol Oblast, a settlement in Pakhomovsky Selsoviet of Orlovsky District
- Ozerki, Sverdlovsky District, Oryol Oblast, a village in Novopetrovsky Selsoviet of Sverdlovsky District
- Ozerki, Verkhovsky District, Oryol Oblast, a village in Galichinsky Selsoviet of Verkhovsky District

=== Penza Oblast ===
As of 2010, four rural localities in Penza Oblast bear this name:

- Ozerki, Belinsky District, Penza Oblast, a village in Kozlovsky Selsoviet of Belinsky District
- Ozerki, Mokshansky District, Penza Oblast, a selo in Podgornensky Selsoviet of Mokshansky District
- Ozerki, Sosnovoborsky District, Penza Oblast, a selo in Nikolo-Barnukovsky Selsoviet of Sosnovoborsky District
- Ozerki, Tamalinsky District, Penza Oblast, a village in Ulyanovsky Selsoviet of Tamalinsky District

=== Perm Krai ===
As of 2010, one rural locality in Perm Krai bears this name:

- Ozerki, Perm Krai, a village in Oktyabrsky District

=== Pskov Oblast ===
As of 2010, two rural localities in Pskov Oblast bear this name:

- Ozerki, Gdovsky District, Pskov Oblast, a village in Gdovsky District
- Ozerki, Loknyansky District, Pskov Oblast, a village in Loknyansky District

=== Rostov Oblast ===
As of 2010, one rural locality in Rostov Oblast bears this name:

- Ozerki, Rostov Oblast, a khutor in Krasnoluchskoye Rural Settlement of Oktyabrsky District

=== Ryazan Oblast ===
As of 2010, five rural localities in Ryazan Oblast bear this name:

- Ozerki, Kasimovsky District, Ryazan Oblast, a village in Giblitsky Rural Okrug of Kasimovsky District
- Ozerki, Klepikovsky District, Ryazan Oblast, a village in Bychkovsky Rural Okrug of Klepikovsky District
- Ozerki, Miloslavsky District, Ryazan Oblast, a selo in Bogoroditsky Rural Okrug of Miloslavsky District
- Ozerki, Pronsky District, Ryazan Oblast, a settlement in Alyutovsky Rural Okrug of Pronsky District
- Ozerki, Sarayevsky District, Ryazan Oblast, a selo in Ozerkovsky Rural Okrug of Sarayevsky District

=== Samara Oblast ===
As of 2010, two rural localities in Samara Oblast bear this name:

- Ozerki, Chelno-Vershinsky District, Samara Oblast, a selo in Chelno-Vershinsky District
- Ozerki, Volzhsky District, Samara Oblast, a settlement in Volzhsky District

=== Saratov Oblast ===
As of 2010, four rural localities in Saratov Oblast bear this name:

- Ozerki, Dukhovnitsky District, Saratov Oblast, a selo in Dukhovnitsky District
- Ozerki, Kalininsky District, Saratov Oblast, a selo in Kalininsky District
- Ozerki, Lysogorsky District, Saratov Oblast, a selo in Lysogorsky District
- Ozerki, Petrovsky District, Saratov Oblast, a selo in Petrovsky District

=== Stavropol Krai ===
As of 2010, one rural locality in Stavropol Krai bears this name:

- Ozerki, Stavropol Krai, a settlement in Medvezhensky Selsoviet of Krasnogvardeysky District

=== Sverdlovsk Oblast ===
As of 2010, two rural localities in Sverdlovsk Oblast bear this name:

- Ozerki, Krasnoufimsky District, Sverdlovsk Oblast, a village in Krasnoufimsky District
- Ozerki, Taborinsky District, Sverdlovsk Oblast, a village in Taborinsky District

=== Tambov Oblast ===
As of 2015, five rural localities in Tambov Oblast bear this name:

- Ozerki, Michurinsky District, Tambov Oblast, a village in Starokazinsky Selsoviet of Michurinsky District
- Ozerki, Nikiforovsky District, Tambov Oblast, a selo in Ozersky Selsoviet of Nikiforovsky District
- Ozerki, Pervomaysky District, Tambov Oblast, a village in Staroklensky Selsoviet of Pervomaysky District
- Ozerki, Petrovsky District, Tambov Oblast, a selo in Shekhmansky Selsoviet of Petrovsky District
- Ozerki, Tambovsky District, Tambov Oblast, a village in Novoseltsevsky Selsoviet of Tambovsky District

=== Tula Oblast ===
As of 2010, five rural localities in Tula Oblast bear this name:

- Ozerki, Kireyevsky District, Tula Oblast, a village in Bolshekalmyksky Rural Okrug of Kireyevsky District
- Ozerki, Kurkinsky District, Tula Oblast, a village in Krestovskaya Volost of Kurkinsky District
- Ozerki, Novomoskovsky District, Tula Oblast, a village in Ozerkovsky Rural Okrug of Novomoskovsky District
- Ozerki, Tyoplo-Ogaryovsky District, Tula Oblast, a village in Lidinsky Rural Okrug of Tyoplo-Ogaryovsky District
- Ozerki, Yefremovsky District, Tula Oblast, a village in Yaroslavsky Rural Okrug of Yefremovsky District

=== Tver Oblast ===
As of 2010, four rural localities in Tver Oblast bear this name:

- Ozerki, Konakovsky District, Tver Oblast, a settlement in Konakovsky District
- Ozerki, Ostashkovsky District, Tver Oblast, a village in Ostashkovsky District
- Ozerki, Sonkovsky District, Tver Oblast, a village in Sonkovsky District
- Ozerki, Zapadnodvinsky District, Tver Oblast, a settlement in Zapadnodvinsky District

=== Tyumen Oblast ===
As of 2010, one rural locality in Tyumen Oblast bears this name:

- Ozerki, Tyumen Oblast, a settlement in Zavodoukovsky District

=== Udmurt Republic ===
As of 2010, one rural locality in the Udmurt Republic bears this name:

- Ozerki, Udmurt Republic, a village in Kazakovsky Selsoviet of Yarsky District

=== Ulyanovsk Oblast ===
As of 2010, three rural localities in Ulyanovsk Oblast bear this name:

- Ozerki, Cherdaklinsky District, Ulyanovsk Oblast, a selo in Ozersky Rural Okrug of Cherdaklinsky District
- Ozerki, Kuzovatovsky District, Ulyanovsk Oblast, a selo in Bezvodovsky Rural Okrug of Kuzovatovsky District
- Ozerki, Veshkaymsky District, Ulyanovsk Oblast, a selo under the administrative jurisdiction of Veshkaymsky Settlement Okrug of Veshkaymsky District

=== Vladimir Oblast ===
As of 2010, one rural locality in Vladimir Oblast bears this name:

- Ozerki, Vladimir Oblast, a village in Vyaznikovsky District

=== Volgograd Oblast ===
As of 2010, two rural localities in Volgograd Oblast bear this name:

- Ozerki, Ilovlinsky District, Volgograd Oblast, a khutor in Ozersky Selsoviet of Ilovlinsky District
- Ozerki, Kikvidzensky District, Volgograd Oblast, a khutor in Ozerkinsky Selsoviet of Kikvidzensky District

=== Vologda Oblast ===
As of 2010, three rural localities in Vologda Oblast bear this name:

- Ozerki (settlement), Dmitriyevsky Selsoviet, Nyuksensky District, Vologda Oblast, a settlement in Dmitriyevsky Selsoviet of Nyuksensky District
- Ozerki (village), Dmitriyevsky Selsoviet, Nyuksensky District, Vologda Oblast, a village in Dmitriyevsky Selsoviet of Nyuksensky District
- Ozerki, Vytegorsky District, Vologda Oblast, a village in Ankhimovsky Selsoviet of Vytegorsky District

=== Voronezh Oblast ===
As of 2010, one rural locality in Voronezh Oblast bears this name:

- Ozerki, Voronezh Oblast, a selo in Ozerskoye Rural Settlement of Buturlinovsky District

=== Yaroslavl Oblast ===
As of 2010, three rural localities in Yaroslavl Oblast bear this name:

- Ozerki (selo), Seredskoy Rural Okrug, Danilovsky District, Yaroslavl Oblast, a selo in Seredskoy Rural Okrug of Danilovsky District
- Ozerki (village), Seredskoy Rural Okrug, Danilovsky District, Yaroslavl Oblast, a village in Seredskoy Rural Okrug of Danilovsky District
- Ozerki, Yaroslavsky District, Yaroslavl Oblast, a village in Tolbukhinsky Rural Okrug of Yaroslavsky District

== Abolished localities ==
- Ozerki, Gavrilovsky District, Tambov Oblast, a former settlement in Bulgakovsky Selsoviet of Gavrilovsky District in Tambov Oblast; abolished in March 2015

== See also ==
- Malye Ozerki
