= Krutoy =

Krutoy or Krutoi may refer to:

== Locations in Russia ==
- Krutoy, Volgograd Oblast
- Krutoy Log
- Krutoy Ovrag

== People ==
- Igor Krutoy (born 1954), Ukrainian and Russian music composer, performer and producer
