= Neklinovsky constituency =

Russian legislative constituency in Rostov Oblast

Neklinovsky single-member constituency
- Constituency of the Russian State Duma
- Deputy: Artyom Velichko; United Russia
- Federal subject: Rostov Oblast
- Districts: Kuybyshevsky, Matveyevo-Kurgansky, Myasnikovsky, Neklinovsky, Novoshakhtinsk, Oktyabrsky (Alekseyevskoye, Bessergenevskoye, Kamenolomni, Kommunarskoye, Krasnokutskoye, Krasnoluchskoye, Krasyukovskoye, Krivyanskoye, Mokrologskoye, Persianovskoye), Rodionovo-Nesvetaysky, Taganrog
- Voters: 494,081 (2026)

The Neklinovsky constituency (No.154 (Note: Taganrog constituency No.146 in 1993-1995, Taganrog constituency No.147 in 1995-2007, Taganrog constituency No.151 in 2016–2026)) is a Russian legislative constituency in Rostov Oblast. The constituency covers western Rostov Oblast, including the industrial cities Taganrog and Novoshakhtinsk.

The constituency has been represented since 2026 by United Russia deputy Artyom Velichko, former Member of Legislative Assembly of Rostov Oblast and agribusinessman, who won the open seat after one-term United Russia incumbent Sergey Burlakov successfully sought re-election on the party list.

== Boundaries ==
1993–1995 Taganrog constituency: Aksaysky District, Kuybyshevsky District, Matveyevo-Kurgansky District, Myasnikovsky District, Neklinovsky District, Novocherkassk, Taganrog
The constituency stretched from Rostov-on-Don northern and north-eastern suburbs to western Rostov Oblast and covered the cities Novocherkassk and Taganrog.

1995–2007 Taganrog constituency: Azov, Azovsky District, Kagalnitsky District, Matveyevo-Kurgansky District, Neklinovsky District, Taganrog
After the 1995 redistricting Rostov Oblast gained the seventh constituency, so all other districts were redrawn. Taganrog constituency lost its eastern portion: Novocherkassk was given to new Belaya Kalitva constituency, Aksaysky District – to Proletarsky constituency, Myasnikovsky District – to Rostov constituency, while Kuybyshevsky District was drawn into Shakhty constituency. This seat instead gained the entirety of the Azov Sea coast and Rostov-on-Don southern suburbs and exurbs, including Azov, from the former Rostov-Sovetsky constituency.

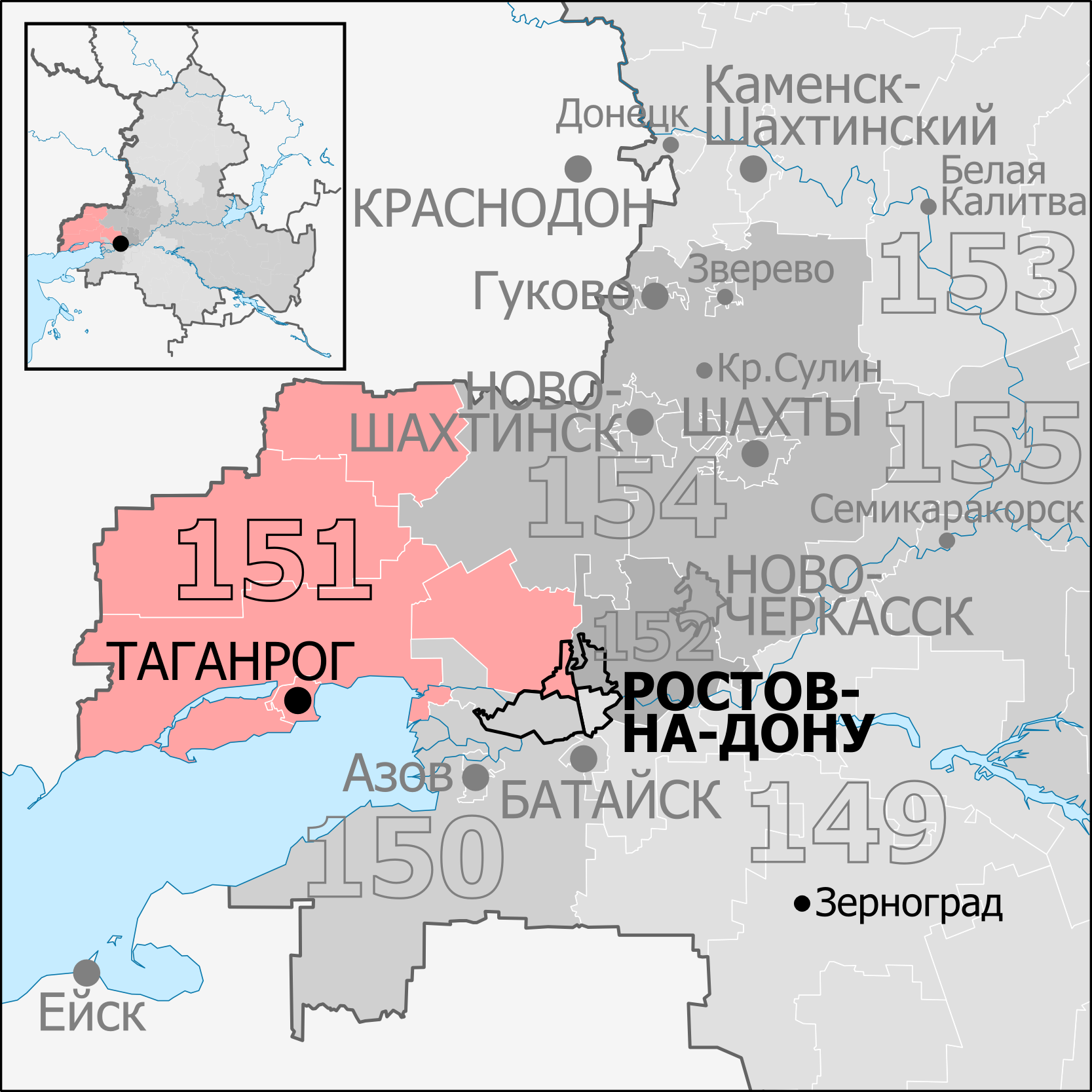
Constituency boundaries from 2016 to 2026

2016–2026 Taganrog constituency: Kuybyshevsky District, Matveyevo-Kurgansky District, Myasnikovsky District (Bolshesalskoye, Chaltyrskoye, Krasnokrymskoye, Krymskoye, Petrovskoye), Neklinovsky District, Rostov-on-Don (Oktyabrsky), Taganrog
The constituency was re-created for the 2016 election and retained only its northern half, losing Kagalnitsky District to Rostov constituency, Azov and Azovsky District – to new Nizhnedonskoy constituency. This seat instead re-gained Kuybyshevsky District from Shakhty constituency as well as was drawn to grab north-western Rostov-on-Don and most of Myasnikovsky District from the former Rostov constituency.

2026–present: Kuybyshevsky District, Matveyevo-Kurgansky District, Myasnikovsky District, Neklinovsky District, Novoshakhtinsk, Oktyabrsky District (Alekseyevskoye, Bessergenevskoye, Kamenolomni, Kommunarskoye, Krasnokutskoye, Krasnoluchskoye, Krasyukovskoye, Krivyanskoye, Mokrologskoye, Persianovskoye), Rodionovo-Nesvetaysky District, Taganrog
Following the 2025 redistricting Rostov Oblast lost one of its seven constituencies, so all the remaining seats saw major changes. The constituency took the name "Neklinovsky constituency" and lost its portion of Rostov-on-Don to Rostov constituency. This seat took the rest of Myasnikovsky District from Nizhnedonskoy constituency and was pushed eastwards to grab Novoshakhtinsk, Rodionovo-Nesvetaysky District and most of Oktyabrsky District from the eliminated Shakhty constituency.

== Members elected ==
Election	Member	Party
1993	Yury Rodionov (Note: appointed Auditor of the Accounts Chamber of Russia in May 1995)	Independent
1995	Nikolay Borisenko	Communist Party
1999	Vladimir Grebenyuk	Independent
2003	Vladimir Grebenyuk	United Russia
2007	Proportional representation - no election by constituency	
2011	Proportional representation - no election by constituency	
2016	Yury Kobzev (Note: appointed Minister of Health of Rostov Oblast in December 2020)	United Russia
2021	Sergey Burlakov	United Russia
2026	Artyom Velichko	United Russia

== Election results ==
=== 1993 ===
Summary of the 12 December 1993 Russian legislative election in the Taganrog constituency
Candidate	Party	Votes	%
Yury Rodionov	Independent	51,370	16.34%
Oleg Nabokov	Independent	–	15.97%
Viktoria Dudchenko	Independent	–	–
Aleksandr Kulikov	Choice of Russia	–	–
Vladimir Lagutov	Yavlinsky—Boldyrev—Lukin	–	–
Yury Mitev	Independent	–	–
Total		314,303	100%

=== 1995 ===
Summary of the 17 December 1995 Russian legislative election in the Taganrog constituency
Candidate	Party	Votes	%
Nikolay Borisenko	Communist Party	81,813	24.96%
Viktor Vodolatsky	Independent	48,468	14.79%
Vladimir Verba	Independent	33,249	10.14%
Sergey Mironov	Yabloko	32,514	9.92%
Nikolay Zheleznyakov	Independent	27,625	8.43%
Vladimir Akimenko	Liberal Democratic Party	21,979	6.71%
Olga Nikitina	Congress of Russian Communities	14,681	4.48%
Yury Mitev	Independent	13,337	4.07%
Gennady Sagalayev	Communists and Working Russia - for the Soviet Union	4,941	1.51%
Vasily Kogan	Serving Russia!	4,832	1.47%
Valery Dronov	Forward, Russia!	4,119	1.16%
Nikolay Popov	Russian All-People's Movement	4,085	1.25%
Vladimir Kolyada	Transformation of the Fatherland	3,393	1.04%
Aleksandr Chernenko	Independent	2,415	0.74%
against all		22,277	6.80%
Total		327,769	100%

=== 1999 ===
Summary of the 19 December 1999 Russian legislative election in the Taganrog constituency
Candidate	Party	Votes	%
Vladimir Grebenyuk	Independent	138,625	43.61%
Nikolay Borisenko (incumbent)	Communist Party	104,576	32.89%
Viktor Radionov	Independent	13,887	4.37%
Anatoly Dygay	Spiritual Heritage	5,637	1.77%
against all		49,272	15.50%
Total		317,910	100%

=== 2003 ===
Summary of the 7 December 2003 Russian legislative election in the Taganrog constituency
Candidate	Party	Votes	%
Vladimir Grebenyuk (incumbent)	United Russia	130,542	51.39%
Viktor Bulgakov	Communist Party	53,334	20.99%
Roman Shakhov	Liberal Democratic Party	13,650	5.37%
Elvira Sharova	Independent	12,419	4.89%
Yury Podkolzin	United Russian Party Rus'	6,433	2.53%
against all		33,098	13.03%
Total		254,146	100%

=== 2016 ===
Summary of the 18 September 2016 Russian legislative election in the Taganrog constituency
Candidate	Party	Votes	%
Yury Kobzev	United Russia	85,849	46.70%
Nikolay Kolomeytsev	Communist Party	38,549	20.97%
Yulia Vasilchenko	Liberal Democratic Party	18,917	10.29%
Aleksandr Pitsenko	A Just Russia	16,020	8.71%
Valery Meleshko	Rodina	4,558	2.48%
Sergey Shalygin	Yabloko	4,222	2.30%
Aleksey Zaydlin	Communists of Russia	4,139	2.25%
Pyotr Malyshevsky	The Greens	2,298	1.25%
Aleksandr Bezruchenko	Civic Platform	1,907	1.04%
Arnold Reizvig	Patriots of Russia	1,200	0.65%
Total		183,844	100%

=== 2021 ===
Summary of the 17-19 September 2021 Russian legislative election in the Taganrog constituency
Candidate	Party	Votes	%
Sergey Burlakov	United Russia	79,452	40.72%
Yevgeny Bessonov	Communist Party	55,886	28.64%
Nikolay Anisimov	Liberal Democratic Party	14,415	8.39%
Sergey Kosinov	A Just Russia — For Truth	10,330	5.29%
Aleksandr Chukhlebov	New People	9,332	4.78%
Lyudmila Sova	Party of Pensioners	8,090	4.15%
Vladimir Beradze	Yabloko	4,042	2.07%
Oleg Kichan	Russian Party of Freedom and Justice	2,972	1.52%
Igor Borisov	Party of Growth	2,630	1.35%
Igor Ponomarenko	Green Alternative	2,445	1.25%
Total		195,110	100%

=== 2026 ===
Summary of the 18-20 September 2026 Russian legislative election in the Neklinovsky constituency
Candidate	Party	Votes	%
Artyom Velichko	United Russia	177,610	55.79%
Sergey Shapovalov	Communist Party	45,635	14.34%
Yevgeny Khizhnyak	Liberal Democratic Party	33,780	10.61%
Vitaly Miroshnikov	New People	21,095	6.63%
Tatyana Pavlenko	A Just Russia	14,442	4.54%
Vitaly Fomin	Yabloko	13,218	4.15%
Aleksey Shalyayev	Party of Pensioners	8,689	2.73%
Total		318,346	100%
