= Mozgly =

Mozgly Мозглы
- Khutor
- Location within Volgograd Oblast Location within Russia
- Coordinates: 50°35′N 43°16′E
- Country: Russia
- Region: Volgograd Oblast
- District: Kikvidzensky District
- Time zone: UTC+4:00

Mozgly (Russian: Мозглы) is a rural locality (a khutor) in Grishinskoye Rural Settlement, Kikvidzensky District, Volgograd Oblast, Russia. The population was 23 as of 2010.

== Geography ==
Mozgly is located in steppe, on Khopyorsko-Buzulukskaya plain, 27 km southeast of Preobrazhenskaya (the district's administrative centre) by road. Chistopol is the nearest rural locality.
