= Dalnestepnoy =

Dalnestepnoy Дальнестепной
- Khutor
- Location within Volgograd Oblast Location within Russia
- Coordinates: 50°34′N 43°05′E
- Country: Russia
- Region: Volgograd Oblast
- District: Kikvidzensky District
- Time zone: UTC+4:00

Dalnestepnoy (Russian: Дальнестепной) is a rural locality (a khutor) in Kalachyovskoye Rural Settlement, Kikvidzensky District, Volgograd Oblast, Russia. The population was 14 as of 2010.

== Geography ==
Dalnestepnoy is located 34 km south of Preobrazhenskaya (the district's administrative centre) by road. Kalachevsky is the nearest rural locality.
