= Grishin, Kikvidzensky District, Volgograd Oblast =

Grishin Гришин
- Settlement
- Location within Volgograd Oblast Location within Russia
- Coordinates: 50°37′N 43°09′E
- Country: Russia
- Region: Volgograd Oblast
- District: Kikvidzensky District
- Time zone: UTC+4:00

Grishin (Russian: Гришин) is a rural locality (a settlement) and the administrative center of Grishinskoye Rural Settlement, Kikvidzensky District, Volgograd Oblast, Russia. The population was 916 as of 2010. There are 11 streets.

== Geography ==
Grishin is located on Khopyorsko-Buzulukskaya plain, 15 km southeast of Preobrazhenskaya (the district's administrative centre) by road. Krutoy Log is the nearest rural locality.
