= Shiryayevsky, Kikvidzensky District, Volgograd Oblast =

Shiryayevsky Ширяевский
- Khutor
- Location within Volgograd Oblast Location within Russia
- Coordinates: 50°43′N 42°59′E
- Country: Russia
- Region: Volgograd Oblast
- District: Kikvidzensky District
- Time zone: UTC+4:00

Shiryayevsky (Russian: Ширяевский) is a rural locality (a khutor) in Preobrazhenskoye Rural Settlement, Kikvidzensky District, Volgograd Oblast, Russia. The population was 224 as of 2010.

== Geography ==
Shiryayevsky is located on Khopyorsko-Buzulukskaya plain, on the left bank of the Buzuluk River, 6 km southwest of Preobrazhenskaya (the district's administrative centre) by road. Preobrazhenskaya is the nearest rural locality.
