= Chernolagutinsky =

Chernolagutinsky Чернолагутинский
- Khutor
- Location within Volgograd Oblast Location within Russia
- Coordinates: 50°38′N 43°19′E
- Country: Russia
- Region: Volgograd Oblast
- District: Kikvidzensky District
- Time zone: UTC+4:00

Chernolagutinsky (Russian: Чернолагутинский) is a rural locality (a khutor) and the administrative center of Chernorechenskoye Rural Settlement, Kikvidzensky District, Volgograd Oblast, Russia. The population was 818 as of 2010. There are 9 streets.

== Geography ==
Chernolagutinsky is located on Khopyorsko-Buzulukskaya plain, on the left bank of the Chyornaya River, 32 km southeast of Preobrazhenskaya (the district's administrative centre) by road. Besov is the nearest rural locality.
