= Marchukovsky =

Marchukovskiy Марчуковский
- Khutor
- Location within Volgograd Oblast Location within Russia
- Coordinates: 50°41′N 42°49′E
- Country: Russia
- Region: Volgograd Oblast
- District: Kikvidzensky District
- Time zone: UTC+4:00

Marchukovskiy (Russian: Марчуковский) is a rural locality (a khutor) in Dubrovskoye Rural Settlement, Kikvidzensky District, Volgograd Oblast, Russia. Its population was 1 as of 2010.

== Geography ==
Marchukovsky is located on Khopyorsko-Buzulukskaya plain, on the left bank of the Buzuluk River, 25 km southwest of Preobrazhenskaya (the district's administrative centre) by road. Alsyapinsky is the nearest rural locality.
