= Lapin, Volgograd Oblast =

Lapin Лапин
- Khutor
- Location within Volgograd Oblast Location within Russia
- Coordinates: 50°44′N 42°58′E
- Country: Russia
- Region: Volgograd Oblast
- District: Kikvidzensky District
- Time zone: UTC+4:00

Lapin (Russian: Лапин) is a rural locality (a khutor) in Dubrovskoye Rural Settlement, Kikvidzensky District, Volgograd Oblast, Russia. The population was 54 as of 2010. There are 3 streets.

== Geography ==
Lapin is located 7 km west of Preobrazhenskaya (the district's administrative centre) by road. Preobrazhenskaya is the nearest rural locality.
