= Lestyukhin =

Lestyukhin Лестюхин
- Khutor
- Location within Volgograd Oblast Location within Russia
- Coordinates: 50°39′N 42°57′E
- Country: Russia
- Region: Volgograd Oblast
- District: Kikvidzensky District
- Time zone: UTC+4:00

Lestyukhin (Russian: Лестюхин) is a rural locality (a khutor) in Preobrazhenskoye Rural Settlement, Kikvidzensky District, Volgograd Oblast, Russia. The population was 22 as of 2010.

== Geography ==
Lestyukhin is located in steppe, on Khopyorsko-Buzulukskaya plain, on the right bank of the Karman River, 13 km southwest of Preobrazhenskaya (the district's administrative centre) by road. Shiryayevsky is the nearest rural locality.
