= Besov, Volgograd Oblast =

Besov Бесов
- Khutor
- Location within Volgograd Oblast Location within Russia
- Coordinates: 50°38′N 43°23′E
- Country: Russia
- Region: Volgograd Oblast
- District: Kikvidzensky District
- Time zone: UTC+4:00

Besov (Russian: Бесов) is a rural locality (a khutor) in Chernorechenskoye Rural Settlement, Kikvidzensky District, Volgograd Oblast, Russia. The population was 32 as of 2010.

== Geography ==
Besov is located on Khopyorsko-Buzulukskaya plain, on the bank of the Chyornaya River, 37 km southeast of Preobrazhenskaya (the district's administrative centre) by road. Chernolagutinsky is the nearest rural locality.
