= Budyonny, Volgograd Oblast =

Budyonny Будённый
- Khutor
- Location within Volgograd Oblast Location within Russia
- Coordinates: 50°41′N 43°18′E
- Country: Russia
- Region: Volgograd Oblast
- District: Kikvidzensky District
- Time zone: UTC+4:00

Budyonny (Russian: Будённый) is a rural locality (a khutor) in Chernorechenskoye Rural Settlement, Kikvidzensky District, Volgograd Oblast, Russia. The population was 169 as of 2010. There are 3 streets.

== Geography ==
Budyonny is located 26 km southeast of Preobrazhenskaya (the district's administrative centre) by road. Chernolagutinsky is the nearest rural locality.
