= Astakhov, Volgograd Oblast =

Settlement in Kikvidzensky District, Volgograd Oblast, Russia

Astakhov Астахов
- Khutor
- Location within Volgograd Oblast Location within Russia
- Coordinates: 50°36′N 43°26′E
- Country: Russia
- Region: Volgograd Oblast
- District: Kikvidzensky District
- Time zone: UTC+4:00

Astakhov (Russian: Астахов) is a rural locality (a khutor) in Chernorechenskoye Rural Settlement, Kikvidzensky District, Volgograd Oblast, Russia. The population was 37 as of 2010.

== Geography ==
Astakhov is located on Khopyorsko-Buzulukskaya plain, on the left bank of the Chyornaya River, 40 km southeast of Preobrazhenskaya (the district's administrative centre) by road. Besov is the nearest rural locality.
