= Chistopol, Volgograd Oblast =

Chistopol Чистополь
- Khutor
- Location within Volgograd Oblast Location within Russia
- Coordinates: 50°35′N 43°12′E
- Country: Russia
- Region: Volgograd Oblast
- District: Kikvidzensky District
- Time zone: UTC+4:00

Chistopol (Russian: Чистополь) is a rural locality (a khutor) in Grishinskoye Rural Settlement, Kikvidzensky District, Volgograd Oblast, Russia. The population was 132 in 2010. There are two streets.

== Geography ==
Chistopol is located 22 kilometres (14 mi) southeast of Preobrazhenskaya (the district's administrative centre) by road. Krutoy Log is the nearest rural locality.
