= Yezhovka, Kikvidzensky District, Volgograd Oblast =

Yezhovka Ежовка
- Khutor
- Location within Volgograd Oblast Location within Russia
- Coordinates: 50°56′N 43°12′E
- Country: Russia
- Region: Volgograd Oblast
- District: Kikvidzensky District
- Time zone: UTC+4:00

Yezhovka (Russian: Ежовка) is a rural locality (a khutor) and the administrative center of Yezhovskoye Rural Settlement, Kikvidzensky District, Volgograd Oblast, Russia. The population was 824 as of 2010. There are 7 streets.

== Geography ==
Yezhovka is located in steppe, on Khopyorsko-Buzulukskaya plain, on the right bank of the Machekha River, 39 km northeast of Preobrazhenskaya (the district's administrative centre) by road. Mikhaylovka is the nearest rural locality.
