= Kalinovsky, Kikvidzensky District, Volgograd Oblast =

Kalinovsky Калиновский
- Khutor
- Location within Volgograd Oblast Location within Russia
- Coordinates: 50°53′N 43°15′E
- Country: Russia
- Region: Volgograd Oblast
- District: Kikvidzensky District
- Time zone: UTC+4:00

Kalinovsky (Russian: Калиновский) is a rural locality (a khutor) and the administrative center of Kalinovskoye Rural Settlement, Kikvidzensky District, Volgograd Oblast, Russia. The population was 798 as of 2010. There are 6 streets.

== Geography ==
Kalinovsky is located on Khopyorsko-Buzulukskaya plain, on the right bank of the Machekha River, 31 km northeast of Preobrazhenskaya (the district's administrative centre) by road. Machekha is the nearest rural locality.
