= Uvarovka, Volgograd Oblast =

Uvarovka Уваровка
- Khutor
- Location within Volgograd Oblast Location within Russia
- Coordinates: 50°55′N 43°14′E
- Country: Russia
- Region: Volgograd Oblast
- District: Kikvidzensky District
- Time zone: UTC+4:00

Uvarovka (Russian: Уваровка) is a rural locality (a khutor) in Kalinovskoye Rural Settlement, Kikvidzensky District, Volgograd Oblast, Russia. The population was 6 in 2010.

== Geography ==
Uvarovka is located in steppe, on Khopyorsko-Buzulukskaya plain, on the right bank of the Machekha River, 35 km northeast of Preobrazhenskaya (the district's administrative centre) by road. Yezhovka is the nearest rural locality.
