= Zavyazka =

Zavyazka Завязка
- Selo
- Location within Volgograd Oblast Location within Russia
- Coordinates: 50°48′N 43°02′E
- Country: Russia
- Region: Volgograd Oblast
- District: Kikvidzensky District
- Time zone: UTC+4:00

Zavyazka (Russian: Завязка) is a rural locality (a selo) and the administrative center of Zavyazenskoye Rural Settlement, Kikvidzensky District, Volgograd Oblast, Russia. The population was 1,073 as of 2010. There are 13 streets.

== Geography ==
Zavyazka is located on Khopyorsko-Buzulukskaya plain, on the Zavyazka River, 9 km north of Preobrazhenskaya (the district's administrative centre) by road. Preobrazhenskaya is the nearest rural locality.
