= Kuzkin, Volgograd Oblast =

Kuzkin Кузькин
- Selo
- Location within Volgograd Oblast Location within Russia
- Coordinates: 50°36′N 42°59′E
- Country: Russia
- Region: Volgograd Oblast
- District: Kikvidzensky District
- Time zone: UTC+4:00

Kuzkin (Russian: Кузькин) is a rural locality (a selo) in Kalachyovskoye Rural Settlement, Kikvidzensky District, Volgograd Oblast, Russia. The population was 110 as of 2010. There are 2 streets.

== Geography ==
Kuzkin is located 21 km southwest of Preobrazhenskaya (the district's administrative centre) by road. Lestyukhin is the nearest rural locality.
