= Strakhov, Volgograd Oblast =

Strakhov Страхов
- Khutor
- Location within Volgograd Oblast Location within Russia
- Coordinates: 50°47′N 42°52′E
- Country: Russia
- Region: Volgograd Oblast
- District: Kikvidzensky District
- Time zone: UTC+4:00

Strakhov (Russian: Страхов) is a rural locality (a khutor) in Dubrovskoye Rural Settlement, Kikvidzensky District, Volgograd Oblast, Russia. The population was 196 as of 2010.

== Geography ==
Strakhov is located on Khopyorsko-Buzulukskaya plain, on the left bank of the Kardail River, 24 km northwest of Preobrazhenskaya (the district's administrative centre) by road. Galushkinsky is the nearest rural locality.
