= Machekha =

Machekha Мачеха
- Selo
- Location within Volgograd Oblast Location within Russia
- Coordinates: 50°48′N 43°18′E
- Country: Russia
- Region: Volgograd Oblast
- District: Kikvidzensky District
- Time zone: UTC+4:00

Machekha (Russian: Мачеха) is a rural locality (a selo) and the administrative center of Macheshanskoye Rural Settlement, Kikvidzensky District, Volgograd Oblast, Russia. The population was 2,475 as of 2010. There are 16 streets.

== Geography ==
Machekha is located 21 km northeast of Preobrazhenskaya (the district's administrative centre) by road. Ozerki is the nearest rural locality.
