= Alontsevo =

Alontsevo Алонцево
- Selo
- Location within Volgograd Oblast Location within Russia
- Coordinates: 50°54′N 43°01′E
- Country: Russia
- Region: Volgograd Oblast
- District: Kikvidzensky District
- Time zone: UTC+4:00

Alontsevo (Russian: Алонцево) is a rural locality (a selo) in Zavyazenskoye Rural Settlement, Kikvidzensky District, Volgograd Oblast, Russia. The population was 213 as of 2010. There are 3 streets.

== Geography ==
Alontsevo is located on Khopyorsko-Buzulukskaya plain, on the Zavyazka River, 20 km north of Preobrazhenskaya (the district's administrative centre) by road. Zavyazka is the nearest rural locality.
