= Church of Moscow Metropolitan Alexius =

Russian Orthodox church in Russia

Coordinates: 47.2349°N 40.2002°E

The Church of Moscow Metropolitan Alexis

Religion
- Affiliation: Russian Orthodox

Location
- Location: Bessergenevskaya stanitsa, Oktyabrsky District, Rostov Oblast, Russia
- Interactive map of The Church of Moscow Metropolitan Alexis

Architecture
- Completed: 1882

The Church of Alexius, Moscow Metropolitan Alexius (Russian: Церковь Алексия, митрополита Московского) ― is a Russian Orthodox church in Bessergenevskaya stanitsa, Oktyabrsky District, Rostov Oblast, Russia. It belongs to Nizhnedonsky Deanery of Shakhty and Millerovo Diocese and is also recognized as an object of the cultural heritage of Russia.

== History ==
The first mention of the Church of Alexius, Metropolitan of Moscow in Bessergenevskaya village dates back to 1647. In 1797, due to dilapidation of the old church, a new, wooden one with a bell tower was built. The latter was consecrated in 1800 also in the name of Metropolitan Alexius. In 1810 the stanitsa moved to a new place. The temple was also transferred. In 1858, it was moved again, this time to Kazachy-Kadamovsky khutor.

In 1882, instead of the wooden church, a stone church was erected. The old church was later moved to Yagodinka village. This new stone church has had two chapels: the first one was consecrated in the name of the Kazan Icon of the Mother of God and the second one in the name of three saints, the Three Holy Hierarchs.

In 1920s the church was closed and a forage warehouse was established inside. In 1957, a bolt of lightning struck inside the bell-tower and damaged its walls.

In 1992, on decree issued by Rostov Oblast administration, the church building was recognized as an object of the cultural heritage of Russia.

Nowadays the church is open again.
