= Ozerki, Kikvidzensky District, Volgograd Oblast =

Ozerki Озерки
- Khutor
- Location within Volgograd Oblast Location within Russia
- Coordinates: 50°46′N 43°13′E
- Country: Russia
- Region: Volgograd Oblast
- District: Kikvidzensky District
- Time zone: UTC+4:00

Ozerki (Russian: Озерки) is a rural locality (a khutor) and the administrative center of Ozerkinskoye Rural Settlement, Kikvidzensky District, Volgograd Oblast, Russia. The population was 589 as of 2010.

== Geography ==
Ozerki is located on Khopyorsko-Buzulukskaya plain, on the left bank of the Buzuluk River, 13 km northeast of Preobrazhenskaya (the district's administrative centre) by road. Kazarino is the nearest rural locality.
