= Gordeyevsky, Volgograd Oblast =

Gordeyevsky Гордеевский
- Khutor
- Location within Volgograd Oblast Location within Russia
- Coordinates: 50°47′N 43°06′E
- Country: Russia
- Region: Volgograd Oblast
- District: Kikvidzensky District
- Time zone: UTC+4:00

Gordeyevsky (Russian: Гордеевский) is a rural locality (a khutor) in Ozerkinskoye Rural Settlement, Kikvidzensky District, Volgograd Oblast, Russia. The population was 2 as of 2010.

== Geography ==
Gordeyevsky is located on Khopyorsko-Buzulukskaya plain, on the right bank of the Buzuluk River, 16 km northeast of Preobrazhenskaya (the district's administrative centre) by road. Peschanovka is the nearest rural locality.
