= Gordeyevsky (rural locality) =

Gordeyevsky (Russian: Горде́евский; masculine), Gordeyevskaya (Горде́евская; feminine), or Gordeyevskoye (Горде́евское; neuter) is the name of several rural localities in Russia:

- Gordeyevsky, Altai Krai, a settlement in Gordeyevsky Selsoviet of Troitsky District of Altai Krai
- Gordeyevsky, Volgograd Oblast, a khutor in Semenovsky Selsoviet of Kikvidzensky District of Volgograd Oblast
