= Krutoy Log =

Krutoy Log Крутой Лог
- Khutor
- Location within Volgograd Oblast Location within Russia
- Coordinates: 50°36′N 43°10′E
- Country: Russia
- Region: Volgograd Oblast
- District: Kikvidzensky District
- Time zone: UTC+4:00

Krutoy Log (Russian: Крутой Лог) is a rural locality (a khutor) in Grishinskoye Rural Settlement, Kikvidzensky District, Volgograd Oblast, Russia. The population was 209 as of 2010. There are 2 streets.

== Geography ==
Krutoy Log is located 18 km southeast of Preobrazhenskaya (the district's administrative centre) by road. Grishin is the nearest rural locality.
