= Andrei Grechko =

Soviet military commander (1903–1976)

Marshal of the Soviet Union Andrei Grechko
- Андрей Гречко
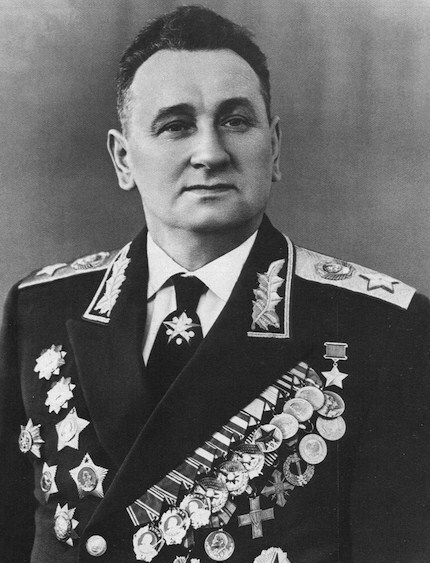
- Grechko in 1960

Minister of Defence of the Soviet Union
- In office 12 April 1967 – 26 April 1976
- Premier: Alexei Kosygin
- Preceded by: Rodion Malinovsky
- Succeeded by: Dmitry Ustinov

Supreme Commander of Warsaw Pact Armed Forces
- In office 1 April 1960 – 12 April 1967
- Preceded by: Ivan Konev
- Succeeded by: Ivan Yakubovsky

Commander-in-Chief of the Soviet Military Administration in Germany
- In office 26 May 1953 – 17 November 1957
- Preceded by: Vasily Chuikov
- Succeeded by: Matvei Zakharov

Commander of the Kiev Military District
- In office 9 July 1945 – 25 May 1953
- Preceded by: Vasyl Herasymenko
- Succeeded by: Vasily Chuikov

Full member of the 24th Politburo of the Communist Party of the Soviet Union
- In office 27 April 1973 – 26 April 1976

Personal details
- Born: Andrei Antonovich Greczhko; 4 October 1903 Golodaevka, Don Host Oblast, Russian Empire
- Died: 26 April 1976 (aged 72) Moscow, Russian SFSR, Soviet Union
- Resting place: Kremlin Wall Necropolis, Moscow
- Party: Communist Party of the Soviet Union (1928–1976)
- Other political affiliations: Communist Party of Ukraine
- Profession: Soldier
- Awards: Hero of the Soviet Union (twice)
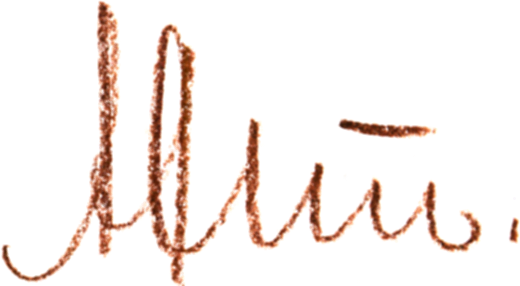
- Signature

Military service
- Allegiance: Soviet Russia (1919–1922); Soviet Union (1922–1976)
- Branch/service: Soviet Army
- Years of service: 1919–1976
- Rank: Marshal of the Soviet Union (1955–1976)
- Commands: 18th Army; 1st Guards Army; Kiev Military District
- Battles/wars: Russian Civil War; World War II; Soviet invasion of Poland; Great Patriotic War; First Battle of Kiev; Barvenkovo–Lozovaya offensive; Battle of the Caucasus; Battle of the Dnieper; Second Battle of Kiev; Zhitomir–Berdichev offensive; Lvov–Sandomierz offensive; Western Carpathian offensive; Moravia–Ostrava offensive; Prague Offensive; Ukrainian insurgency; Cold War; East German uprising; Hungarian uprising; Warsaw Pact invasion of Czechoslovakia

Andrei Antonovich Grechko (Russian: Андре́й Анто́нович Гре́чко; Ukrainian: Андрій Антонович Гречко; 17 October [O.S. 4 October] 1903 – 26 April 1976) was a Soviet military commander and Marshal of the Soviet Union during the Cold War. He served as the Soviet minister of defence from 1967 to 1976.

Born to a Ukrainian peasant family near Rostov-on-Don, Grechko served in the Red Army cavalry during the Russian Civil War. After graduating from the Frunze Military Academy, he took part in the Soviet invasion of Poland in 1939. Grechko was a fresh graduate of the Voroshilov Military Academy when Axis forces invaded the Soviet Union. He held a succession of cavalry and army commands afterwards and saw action in the Caucasus, Ukraine and Central Europe.

After the war, Grechko commanded the Kiev Military District. In 1953, he was appointed commander-in-chief of Soviet Forces in East Germany, and led the suppression of the East German uprising. In 1955, he was named a Marshal of the Soviet Union. In 1957, he became commander-in-chief of the Soviet Ground Forces, and three years later he also became the commander of the Warsaw Pact forces. In 1967, Grechko was appointed Minister of Defence, and oversaw the subsequent Warsaw Pact invasion of Czechoslovakia and violent border clashes with China. He helped modernize the Soviet Army and was responsible for continuing the Soviet hegemony over Eastern Europe. An ideological hardliner, he was a defender of the first strike nuclear strategy, and only reluctantly supported Leonid Brezhnev's détente with the United States and the Strategic Arms Limitation Talks (SALT). Grechko died in 1976 at the age of 72.

== Early life ==
Grechko was the thirteenth child born to a family of Ukrainian peasants on 17 October 1903, at a small town near Rostov-on-Don.

== Early military career ==
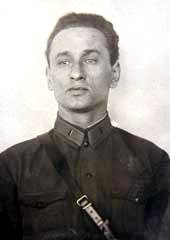
Grechko as a soldier in the Red Army

He joined the Red Army in 1919, where he was a part of the 1st Cavalry Army. During the war, he fought in the Caucasian Front and Southern Front, where he fought in battles against the White Army troops of Generals Anton Denikin and Pyotr Wrangel, and detachments of Ataman Nestor Makhno, and the elimination of political and criminal banditry.

From September 1921 to July 1922, he served in a separate battalion of OSNAZ in Taganrog. He studied at the Crimean Cavalry courses Named After the All-Russian Central Executive Committee, in which he graduated in August 1923. After graduation, he was sent to study at the Taganrog Cavalry School of the North Caucasian Military District and in August 1924, he was transferred to the North Caucasian Mountain Nationalities Cavalry School in Krasnodar. During his studies, he was a foreman of a squadron and from 1925 to 1926, he participated in military operations against gang formations in Chechnya and Dagestan. He graduated in 1926 and became a member of the Communist Party of the Soviet Union.

From September 1926 to April 1932, he served in the 61st Cavalry Regiment of the 1st Separate Cavalry Brigade at the Moscow Military District, and platoon and machine-gun squadron commander.

Grechko graduated from the Military Academy of the Red Army named after M. V. Frunze in 1936. After graduation, he served in the Special Red Banner Cavalry Division named after Joseph Stalin of the Moscow Military District and later transferred to the Belarusian Special Military District, where he served as assistant chief and chief of the 1st (operational) part of the division headquarters and commander of the 62nd Cavalry Regiment. From May 1938 to October 1938, he served as assistant chief of staff of the division.

He graduated from the academy of the General Staff of the Red Army named after K. E. Voroshilov in June 1941.

== World War II ==
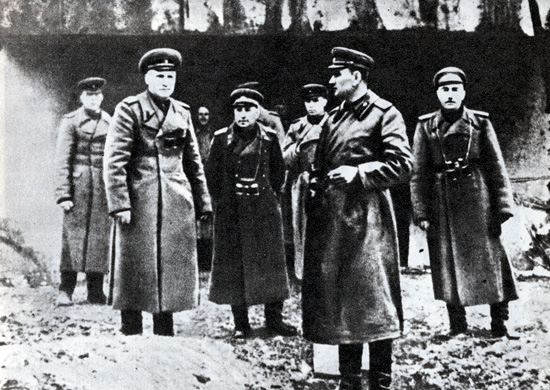
Grechko (center), commander of the 1st Guards Army, at the Árpád Line (1944)

In October 1938, he was appointed as chief of staff of the 62nd Cavalry Regiment. While serving in this position, he participated in the Soviet invasion of Poland.

In the early days of the German invasion of the Soviet Union, Grechko served in the Operational Directorate of the General Staff of the Red Army. Grechko's first command during World War II was of the 34th Cavalry Division, which put up a valiant fight around Kremenchug near Kiev in Ukraine during the First Battle of Kiev. The division was assigned to the 26th, 38th and 6th Armies on the Southwestern Front.

On 15 January 1942, Grechko was put in command of the 5th Cavalry Corps and took part in the Barvenkovo–Lozovaya offensive. From March 1942, he was appointed as commander of the operational group of troops in the Southern Front, which operated in the Donbas. Starting 15 April 1942, Grechko was placed in command of 12th Army and took part in the defense of Voroshilovgrad and from July, took part in the Battle of the Caucasus. In September 1942, Grechko commanded the 47th Army and at the same time acting as commander of the Novorossiysk Defensive Region. He commanded the 47th Army in the Transcaucasian Front from 19 October 1942 and took part in the Tuapse Operation.

From 5 January 1943, Grechko was commander of the 56th Army in the Transcaucasian Front, during which he took part in the North Caucasian Strategic Offensive Operation. After fierce battles in January, his unit broke through the heavily fortified enemy defenses and reached the approaches to Krasnodar. From February to March, as part of the North Caucasian Front, he participated in the Krasnodar Offensive, and then in a number of local and mostly unsuccessful offensive operations of the front troops. In September 1943, the troops of the 56th Army, in cooperation with the 9th and the 18th Armies, liberated the Taman Peninsula from the direction of Novorossiysk, during the Novorossiysk-Taman Strategic Offensive Operation.

Grechko served as the deputy commander of the Voronezh Front from 16 October 1943 and on 20 October, he was appointed as deputy commander of the 1st Ukrainian Front. During this time, he fought in the Battle of the Dnieper and Second Battle of Kiev.

Then, on 14 December 1943, he was made the Commanding General of 1st Guards Army, a position he held until the end of the war. The First Guards Army was a part of the 4th Ukrainian Front, which was led by Col.-Gen. Ivan Yefimovich Petrov. Grechko led the 1st Guards in a number of offensive operations, predominantly in Czechoslovakia, Hungary and into Austria.

== Warsaw Pact command ==
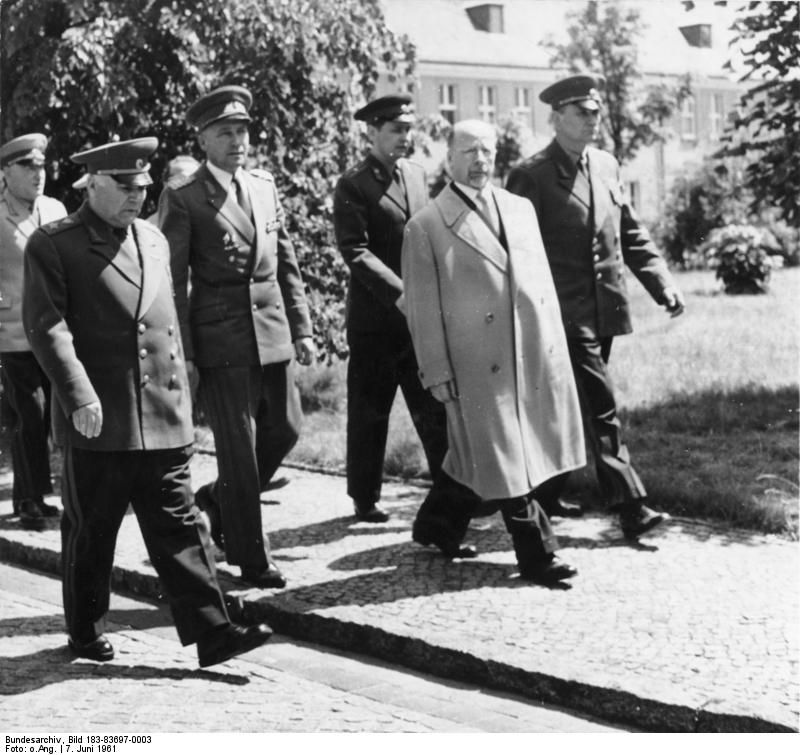
Grechko (far right) with East German leader Walter Ulbricht (center) and Soviet Minister of Defense Marshal Rodion Malinovsky (far left) (1961)

After the war, Grechko was the Commanding General of the Kiev Military District, until 1953. Between 1953 and 1957, Grechko was the Commander-in-Chief of Soviet Forces in East Germany. During this time, he commanded the suppression of the East German uprising of 1953.

On 11 March 1955, Grechko and five other high-ranking colleagues, all of whom gained recognition during the Great Patriotic War as either army or front commanders – Moskalenko, Chuikov, Bagramyan, Biryuzov and Yeremenko - were promoted to the rank of Marshal of the Soviet Union. From 1957 to 1960, Grechko was the Commander-in-Chief of the Ground Forces. By decree of the Presidium of the Supreme Soviet of the USSR of 1 February 1958, "for the courage and heroism shown in the fight against the Nazi invaders", Grechko was awarded the title of Hero of the Soviet Union with the Order of Lenin and the Gold Star medal.

From 1960 to 1967, he was the Commander-in-Chief of the Warsaw Pact Forces.

== Minister of Defense ==
On 12 April 1967, Grechko was made the Minister of Defense, taking over shortly after Marshal Rodion Malinovsky died. Grechko served in this capacity until his death in 1976. During the 1970s, Grechko served as the chairman of the editorial commission that produced the official Soviet history of the Second World War.

In January 1968, following the outbreak of the Prague Spring in Czechoslovakia, Grechko was the major planner and supporter of the Warsaw Pact invasion of the country, which stopped Alexander Dubček's Prague Spring liberalisation reforms and strengthened the authoritarian wing of the Communist Party of Czechoslovakia (KSČ). In March 1969, Chinese and Soviet troops fought in violent border clashes near Damansky Island and Tielieketi. In response to the clashes, Grechko strongly persuaded General Secretary of the Communist Party Leonid Brezhnev to carry out a surgical nuclear strike against China, especially targeting the Lop Nur Nuclear Test Site in the Chinese autonomous region of Xinjiang. Due to the resistance of the party factions headed by Mikhail Suslov and Soviet Premier Alexei Kosygin, who went to Beijing to meet with the Chinese leaders to reduce tensions between the two countries, a nuclear war was avoided.

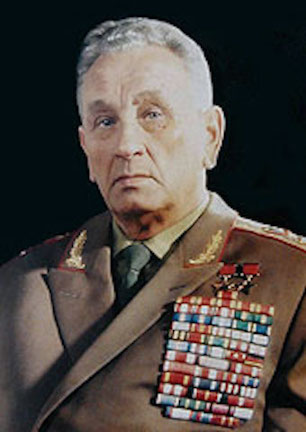
Marshal Andrei Grechko

In December 1971, during the Indo-Pakistani War of 1971, Grechko helped to provide military support to India during the war. During the Arab-Israeli conflict, Grechko oversaw the providing of Soviet military support to Arab countries against Israel. In the final days of the Yom Kippur War in 1973, Grechko authorized the Soviet advisers operating the Scud missile brigade stationed in Egypt to fulfill Egyptian request to launch a barrage of missiles at Israel Defense Forces targets at the Israeli bridgehead on the western bank of the Suez Canal on October 22, just moments before the ceasefire. Seven Israeli soldiers were killed in the attack.

By decree of the Presidium of the Supreme Soviet of the USSR of October 16, 1973, "for services to the Motherland in the construction and strengthening of the Armed Forces of the USSR and in connection with the 70th anniversary of his birth", Grechko was awarded the title of the Hero of the Soviet Union for the second time.

Grechko was an active member in the Communist Party, and was a member of the Politburo. As Minister of Defense, he helped modernize the Soviet Army and was greatly responsible for maintaining the military strength of the Soviet Union. Grechko was known to give preferential treatment to Ukrainians, and attempted to fill command posts with them whenever possible. He was also responsible for maintaining Soviet military might and hegemony over Eastern Europe. An ideological and strategic hardliner, and a reluctant supporter of the Strategic Arms Limitation Talks (SALT), his most notable idea was his assumption that a Third World War would always go nuclear at some point, and as such he planned that if World War III did begin, to launch all-out nuclear strikes against the NATO nations the moment that the war began. For Grechko, nuclear weapons would be weapons of first resort in a world war, not weapons of last resort. His views had caused opposition within the military and the political leadership, who wanted the Soviet Union to have a second strike capacity in order to prevent a war with the United States from going nuclear immediately as he preferred.

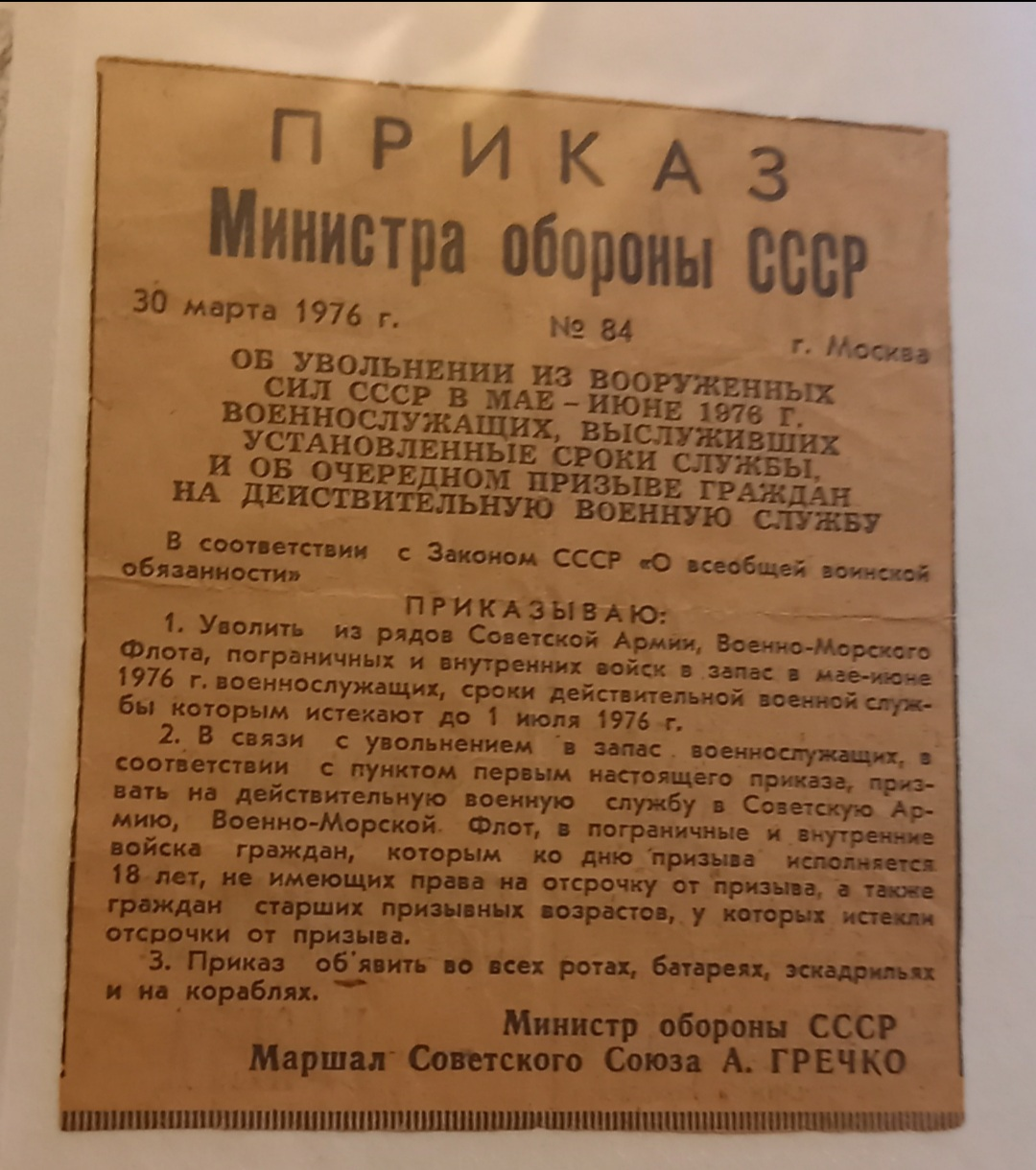

In 1976, shortly before his death, he initiated the deployment of the RSD-10 medium-range ballistic missiles, which led to the NATO Double-Track Decision in the early 1980s.

== Personal life and death ==
Grechko was married to Claudia Vladimirovna Grechko (1907–1990), with whom he had a daughter Tatyana Andreevna (1927–2002). Tatyana was married to Soviet and Russian diplomat Yuriy Kirichenko (1936–2017), the son of First Secretary of the Communist Party of Ukraine Aleksey Kirichenko. According to the memoirs of his contemporaries, Grechko was an enthusiastic fan of the sports club CSKA Moscow. Due to his efforts, the club received not only a new stadium, but also an arena, a base in Arkhangelsk and a host of other sports facilities.

Grechko died on 26 April 1976, at the age of 72. According to The New York Times, Grechko's medical report, which was published by the Soviet press agency TASS stated that he had suffered for a long time from atherosclerosis and coronary insufficiency. He was honoured with a state funeral and cremated on 30 April. The urn containing his ashes is buried by the Kremlin Wall Necropolis.

== Honours and awards ==
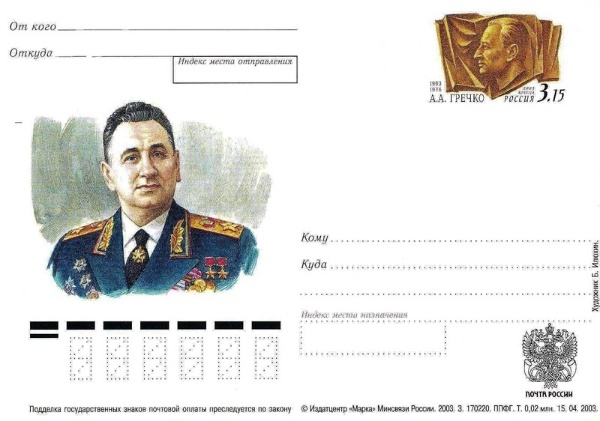
Portrait of Marshal Grechko featured in the 2003 Russian postal cover

Hero of the Soviet Union, twice (1 February 1958, 16 October 1973)
Order of Lenin, six times (December 1942, 1945, 1 February 1958, October 1963, 22 February 1968, 16 October 1973)
Order of the Red Banner, three times (1941, 1944, 1950)
Order of Suvorov, 1st class, twice (1944, 1945)
Order of Suvorov, 2nd class (February 1943)
Order of Kutuzov, 1st class, twice (1943, 1944)
Order of Bogdan Khmelnitsky, 1st class (January 1944)
Medal "For the Defence of Kiev" (1961)
Medal "For the Defence of Moscow" (1944)
Medal "For the Defence of the Caucasus" (1944)
Medal "For the Victory over Germany in the Great Patriotic War 1941–1945" (1945)
Jubilee Medal "In Commemoration of the 100th Anniversary of the Birth of Vladimir Ilyich Lenin" (1969)
Jubilee Medal "Twenty Years of Victory in the Great Patriotic War 1941-1945" (1965)
Jubilee Medal "Thirty Years of Victory in the Great Patriotic War 1941–1945" (1975)
Jubilee Medal "XX Years of the Workers' and Peasants' Red Army" (1938)
Jubilee Medal "30 Years of the Soviet Army and Navy" (1948)
Jubilee Medal "40 Years of the Armed Forces of the USSR" (1958)
Jubilee Medal "50 Years of the Armed Forces of the USSR" (1968)
Honorary weapon – sword inscribed with golden national emblem of the Soviet Union (22 February 1968)

Foreign

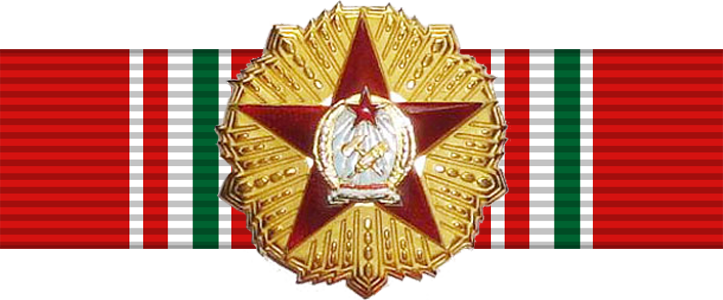
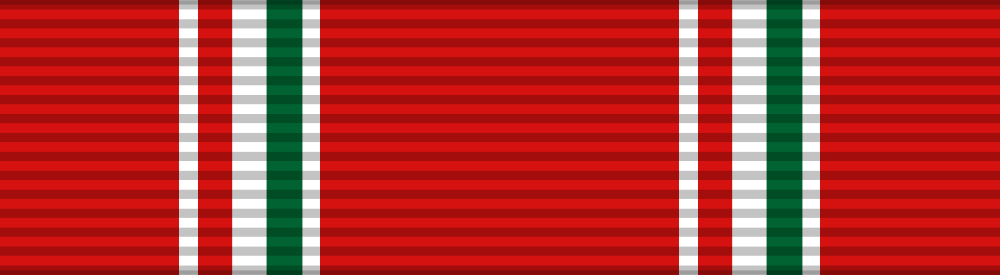
Order of the People's Republic of Bulgaria, 1st class, twice (Bulgaria)
Order of Georgi Dimitrov (Bulgaria)
Medal of Sino-Soviet Friendship (China)
Hero of the Czechoslovak Socialist Republic (Czechoslovakia)
Order of Klement Gottwald (Czechoslovakia)
Military Order of the White Lion "For Victory", 1st class (Czechoslovakia)
War Cross 1939–1945 (Czechoslovakia)
Medal “For Strengthening Friendship in Arms”, Golden class (Czechoslovakia)
Military Commemorative Medal with 'USSR' clasp (Czechoslovakia)
Order of the Lion of Finland, Knight, 1st class (Finland)
Order of Karl Marx (East Germany)
Patriotic Order of Merit in gold (East Germany)
Order of the Flag of the Republic of Hungary (Hungary)
Order of Merit of the Hungarian People's Republic, 1st class (Hungary)
Order of Merit of the Hungarian People's Republic, 5th class (Hungary)
Order of the Two Rivers, military division (Iraq)
Order of Sukhbaatar, twice (Mongolia)
Medal "30 Years of the Victory in Khalkhin-Gol" (Mongolia)
Grand Cross of the Virtuti Militari (Poland)
Grand Cross of the Order of Polonia Restituta (Poland)
Commander's Cross of the Order of Polonia Restituta (Poland)
Order of the Cross of Grunwald, 2nd class (Poland)
Medal "For Oder, Neisse and the Baltic" (Poland)
Medal "For Warsaw 1939-1945" (Poland)
Medal of Victory and Freedom 1945 (Poland)
Brotherhood of Arms Medal (Poland)
Order of the Star of the Romanian Socialist Republic, 1st class (Romania)
Order "August 23" (Romania)

=== Other honors ===
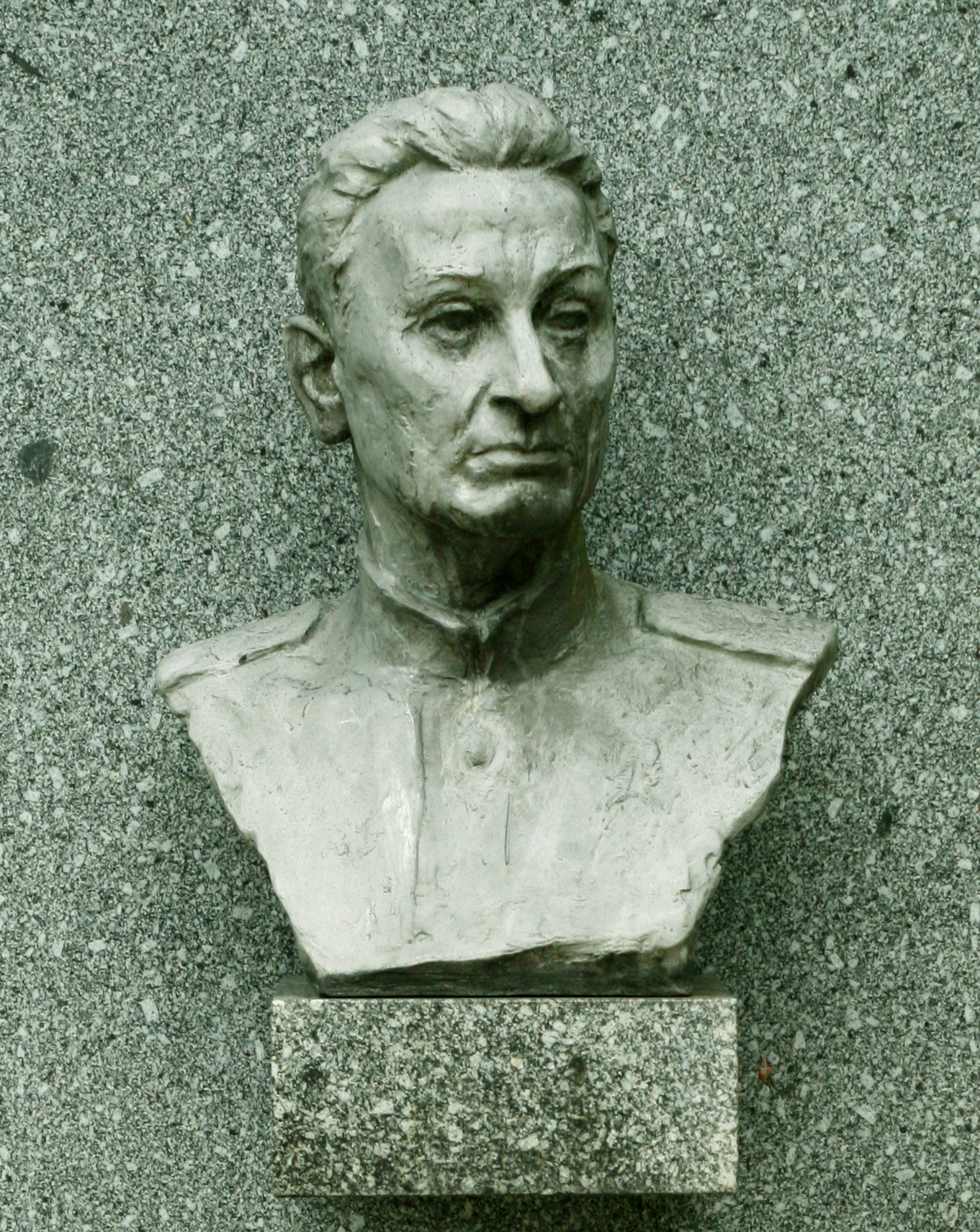
Bronze bust of Grechko at the Alley of Heroes Monument

- Bronze busts honoring Grechko were installed in his hometown at the Kuibyshevo in Rostov Oblast of Russia and Alley of Heroes Monument in Slovakia.
- Following his death in 1976, the Order of Lenin and Ushakov Naval Academy was renamed to Order of Lenin and Ushakov Marshal of the Soviet Union A.A. Grechko Naval Academy in honor of him. In 1990, the academy's name was changed to honor Admiral of the Fleet of the Soviet Union Nikolai Kuznetsov.
- In 1976, part of the former Mozhayskoye Highway in Moscow from General Yermolov Street to Aminyevskoye Highway was named Marshal Grechko Avenue.
- A secondary school in Kuibyshevo was named in honor of Grechko.
- An ore-bulk-oil carrier and oil tanker of the Novorossiysk Shipping Company were named in honor of him.
- Memorial plaques honoring Grechko were installed on the former headquarters of the Kiev Military District and former building of the Military Academy of the General Staff of the Armed Forces of Russia in Moscow.
- Streets are named after him in:
  - Russia: Krymsk
  - Ukraine: Sloviansk, Rovenky, Dnipro, Khmelnytsky and Shostka
  - Uzbekistan: Nukus
    - As part of the decommunization laws in Ukraine, Greckho Streets in Zhytomyr and Kyiv were renamed to honor Vsevolod Petriv and Ivan Vyhovsky respectively.

== Selected works ==
- Great Feat of the Soviet People (1970)
- Battle for the Caucasus (1971)
- Through the Carpathians (1972)
- Liberation of Kiev (1973)
- Liberation Mission of the Soviet Armed Forces in the Second World War (1975)
- Years of War 1941—1943 (1976)
- The Armed Forces of the Soviet Union (1977)

Political offices
Preceded by Rodion Malinovsky	Minister of Defence of Soviet Union; 1967–1976	Succeeded by Dmitriy Ustinov
Military offices
Preceded by Ivan Konev	Supreme Commander of the Unified Armed Forces of the Warsaw Treaty Organization; 1960–1967	Succeeded by Ivan Yakubovsky
