= Church of Michael the Archangel (Kamenolomni) =

Orthodox church in Rostov Oblast, Russia

Coordinates: 47.653932°N 40.187275°E

The Church of Michael the Archangel
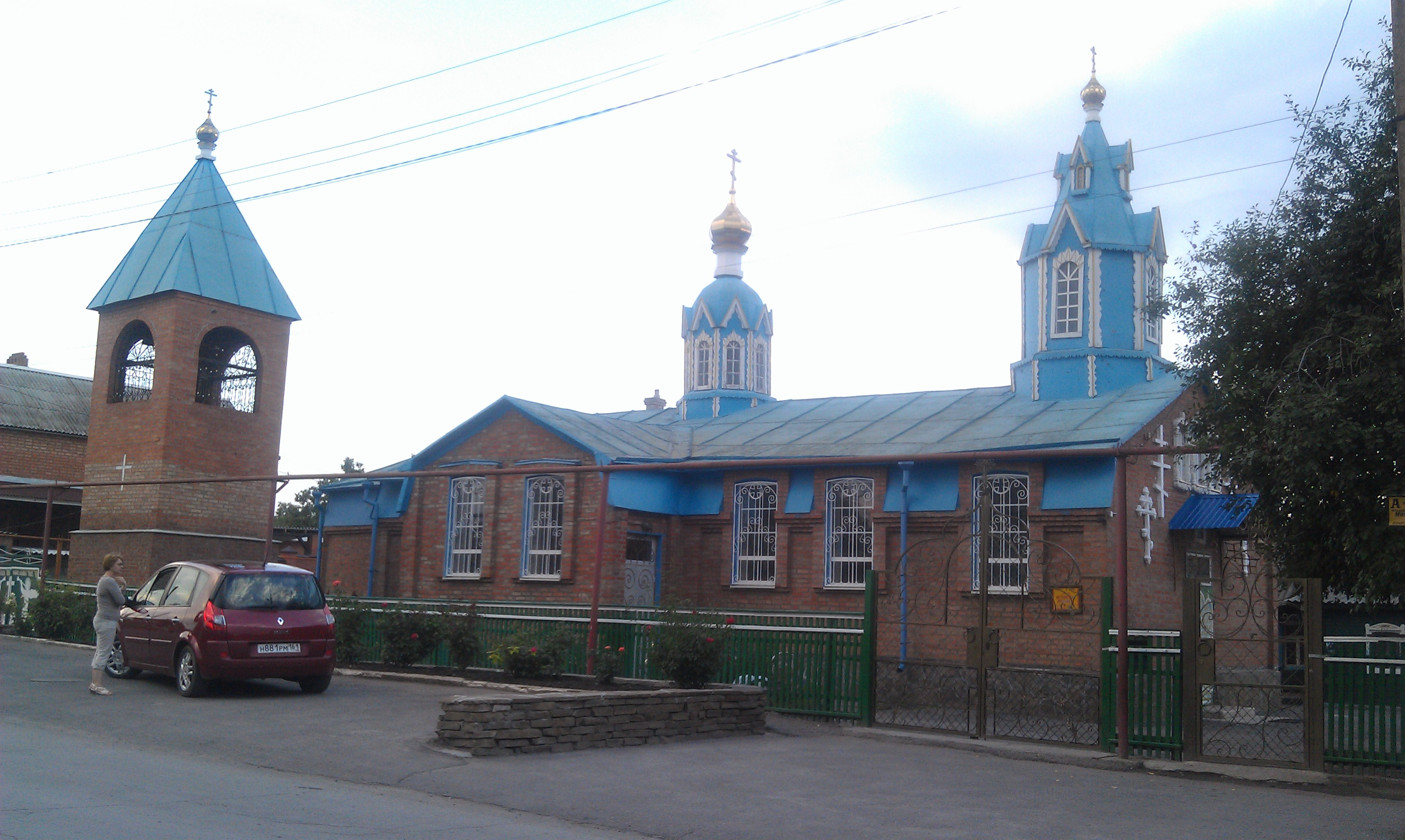

Religion
- Affiliation: Russian Orthodox

Location
- Location: Kamenolomni, Oktyabrsky District, Rostov Oblast, Russia
- Interactive map of The Church of Michael the Archangel

Architecture
- Completed: 1950

The Church of Michael the Archangel (Russian: Церковь Михаила Архангела) is a Russian Orthodox church in the urban-type settlement of Kamenolomni, Oktyabrsky District, Rostov Oblast, Russia. It belongs to the Nizhnedonsky Deanery of Shakhty and Millerovo Diocese of Moscow Patriarchate.

== History ==
Near Maksimovsky khutor (the old name of Kamenolomni settlement) at the end of the 19th century Novogrushevsky farm was established, which was populated by young Cossack families from the village of Krivyanskaya. Two farms were separated from each other by a small stream. In Novogrushevskaya, after a while, a church and a parish school were built. During the Second World War, this church was destroyed, so the religious services had been carried out at a dwelling house.

Since 1948, members of the local Orthodox community had been collecting funds to purchase plots of land and households. Over the years, they were transformed into a church that is still functioning up to this day. Farm buildings and a bell tower with gold domes were erected, and a new Sunday school was also established. In the 1980s, the church was reconstructed and its walls were laid of red brick. In 1992 the church building was officially recognized as an object of cultural heritage of local importance.
