= Golodayevka =

Golodayevka may refer to:

- Golodayevka River, Kemerovo Oblast, Russia
- Former name of Kuybyshevo, Rostov Oblast, Russia
- Former name of Kuybyshevo, Rostov Oblast, Kasharsky District, Russia
