= Beluzhino-Koldairov =

Rural settlement in Ozerki, Volograd Oblast, Russia

Beluzhino-Koldairov Белужино-Колдаиров
- Village
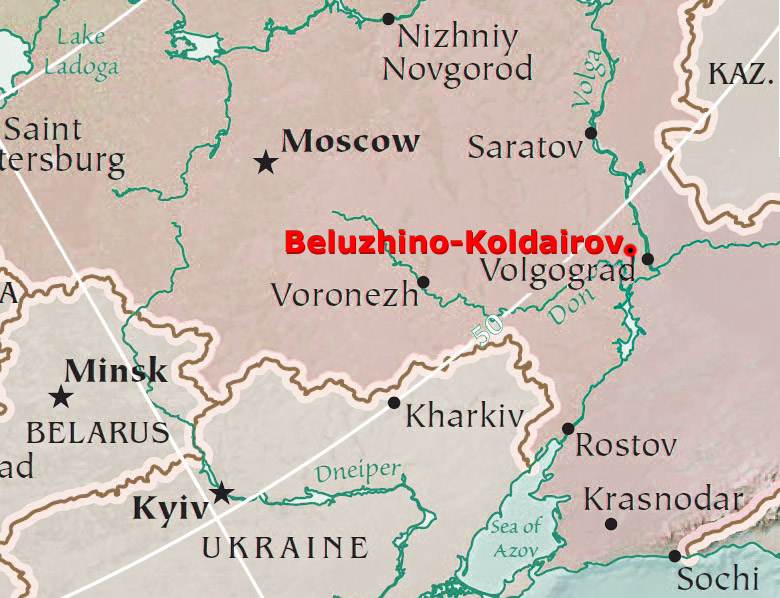
- Beluzhino-Koldairov on the map of Southwestern Russia and surrounding countries
- Coordinates: 49°16′40″N 43°43′32″E
- Country: Russia
- Oblast: Volgograd Oblast
- District: Ilovlinsky District
- Village: Ozerki

Beluzhino-Koldairov (Russian: Белужино-Колдаиров) is a rural settlement and archeological site within the village of Ozerki (Russian: Озерки), located in the Ilovlinsky District, in the central part of the Volgograd Oblast.

It is situated in the steppe zone, between the rivers Don, Ilovlya and Volga, within the Don ridge, in the southern part of the Volga Uplands. The area consists primarily of the Don Natural Park, at the intersection of two natural zones (steppe and semidesert). The park combines the diversity and contrast of the natural environment with the rich legacy of the Cossack peoples who inhabited this land since ancient times.

Beluzhino-Koldairov has an archaeological complex that consists of a large Bronze Age burial mound, surrounded by clusters of small mounds, which are funerary structures dating from the Middle Ages.
