= Gordeyevsky =

Gordeyevsky (masculine), Gordeyevskaya (feminine), or Gordeyevskoye (neuter) may refer to:

- Gordeyevsky District, a district of Bryansk Oblast, Russia
- Gordeyevsky (rural locality), name of several rural localities in Russia
