= Bolshiye Ozerki =

Bolshiye Ozerki Большие Озерки
- Village
- Location within Vologda Oblast Location within Russia
- Coordinates: 59°35′N 39°52′E
- Country: Russia
- Region: Vologda Oblast
- District: Sokolsky District
- Time zone: UTC+3:00

Bolshiye Ozerki (Russian: Большие Озерки) is a rural locality (a village) in Arkhangelskoye Rural Settlement, Sokolsky District, Vologda Oblast, Russia. The population was 13 as of 2002.

== Geography ==
The distance to Sokol is 20 km, to Arkhangelskoye is 5 km. Malye Ozerki is the nearest rural locality.
