= Krush, Republic of Bashkortostan =

Krush Круш
- Selo
- Location within Bashkortostan Location within Russia
- Coordinates: 55°59′N 57°25′E
- Country: Russia
- Region: Bashkortostan
- District: Karaidelsky District
- Time zone: UTC+5:00

Krush (Russian: Круш; Bashkir: Ҡорош, Qoroş) is a rural locality (a selo) in Ozerkinsky Selsoviet, Karaidelsky District, Bashkortostan, Russia. The population was 175 as of 2010. There are 4 streets.

== Geography ==
Krush is located 63 km northeast of Karaidel (the district's administrative centre) by road. Ozerki is the nearest rural locality.
