= Sergey Burlakov =

Russian politician and sportsman

- Сергей Бурлаков
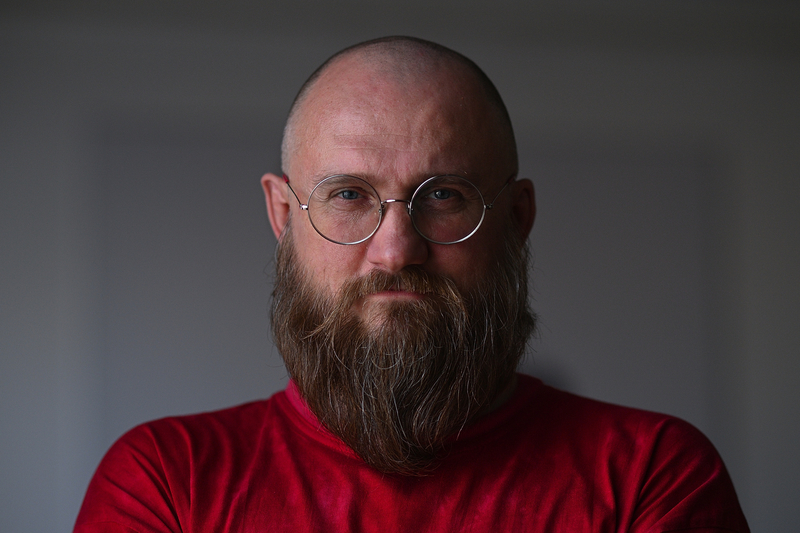

Member of the State Duma for Rostov Oblast
- Incumbent
- Assumed office 12 October 2021
- Preceded by: Yury Kobzev
- Constituency: Taganrog (No. 151)

Personal details
- Born: 26 May 1971 (age 55) Taganrog, Rostov Oblast, Russian SFSR, Soviet Union
- Party: United Russia
- Education: Southern Federal University

Sergey Vladimirovich Burlakov (Russian: Сергей Владимирович Бурлаков; born 26 May 1971, Taganrog, Rostov Oblast) is a Paralympic athlete, Russian political figure, and deputy of the State Duma of the 8th convocation. In 1992 Sergey Burlakov was badly injured in a car crash; and he spent the night at a temperature of -45 °C being completely immobilized. To save Burlakov's life, doctors decided to amputate his hands and legs (to the knees). After the crash, Burlakov started to engage in sport and soon became a multiple champion of Russia in swimming and athletics among Paralympic athletes.

From 2019 to 2021, he was a member of the Civic Chamber of the Russian Federation. In 2020, he was a part of the working group on the amendments to the Russian Constitution. Since September 2021, he has served as a deputy of the 8th State Duma. He represents the Taganrog constituency

Sergey Burlakov has been married twice and has three children.

== Sanctions ==
He was sanctioned by the UK government in 2022 in relation to the Russo-Ukrainian War.
