= Ozerki, Karaidelsky District, Republic of Bashkortostan =

Ozerki Озерки
- Village
- Location within Bashkortostan Location within Russia
- Coordinates: 56°02′N 57°26′E
- Country: Russia
- Region: Bashkortostan
- District: Karaidelsky District
- Time zone: UTC+5:00

Ozerki (Russian: Озерки) is a rural locality (a village) and the administrative centre of Ozerkinsky Selsoviet, Karaidelsky District, Bashkortostan, Russia. The population was 501 as of 2010. There are 3 streets.

== Geography ==
Ozerki is located 68 km northeast of Karaidel (the district's administrative centre) by road. Krush is the nearest rural locality.
