= Kuybyshevsky District, Rostov Oblast =

Kuybyshevsky District Куйбышевский район (Russian)
- District
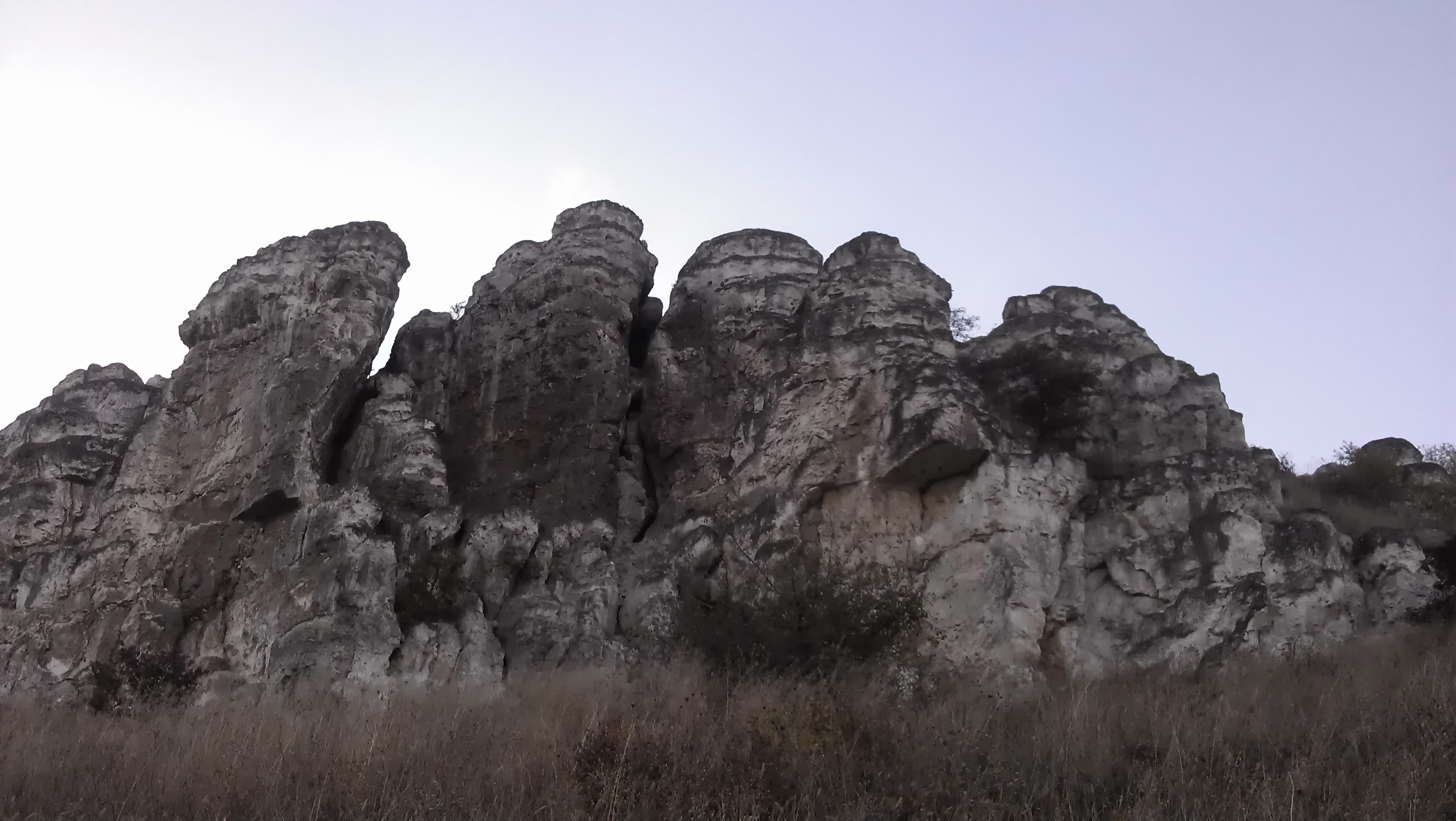
- Lysogorka, Cretaceous Rocks, Kuybyshevsky District

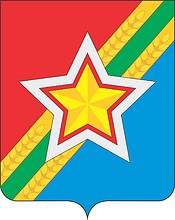
- Flag Coat of arms
- Location of Kuybyshevsky District in Rostov Oblast
- Coordinates: 47°49′06″N 38°54′30″E
- Country: Russia
- Federal subject: Rostov Oblast
- Established: 1923
- Administrative center: Kuybyshevo

Area
  - Total: 871 km^{2} (336 sq mi)

Population (2010 Census)
  - Total: 14,800
  - Density: 17.0/km^{2} (44.0/sq mi)
  - Urban: 0%
  - Rural: 100%

Administrative structure
  - Administrative divisions: 3 rural settlement
  - Inhabited localities: 34 rural localities

Municipal structure
  - Municipally incorporated as: Kuybyshevsky Municipal District
  - Municipal divisions: 0 urban settlements, 3 rural settlements
- Time zone: UTC+3 (MSK)
- OKTMO ID: 60627000
- Website: http://kuibadm.donland.ru/

Kuybyshevsky District (Russian: Ку́йбышевский райо́н) is an administrative and municipal district (raion), one of the forty-three in Rostov Oblast, Russia. It is located in the west of the oblast. The area of the district is 871 square kilometers (336 sq mi). Its administrative center is the rural locality (a selo) of Kuybyshevo. Population: 14,800 (2010 Census); 15,237 (2002 census); 14,061 (1989 Soviet census). The population of Kuybyshevo accounts for 41.5% of the district's total population.

== Notable residents ==
- Andrei Grechko (1903–1976), Soviet Minister of Defence 1967–1976
