= Ozerki, Meleuzovsky District, Republic of Bashkortostan =

Ozerki Озерки
- Village
- Location within Bashkortostan Location within Russia
- Coordinates: 52°55′N 55°47′E
- Country: Russia
- Region: Bashkortostan
- District: Meleuzovsky District
- Time zone: UTC+5:00

Ozerki (Russian: Озерки) is a rural locality (a village) in Shevchenkovsky Selsoviet, Meleuzovsky District, Bashkortostan, Russia. The population was 127 as of 2010. There are 2 streets.

== Geography ==
Ozerki is located 17 km southwest of Meleuz (the district's administrative centre) by road. Antonovka is the nearest rural locality.
