= Krutoy Ovrag =

Krutoy Ovrag Крутой Овраг
- Village
- Location within Vladimir Oblast Location within Russia
- Coordinates: 56°09′N 40°08′E
- Country: Russia
- Region: Vladimir Oblast
- District: Sobinsky District
- Time zone: UTC+3:00

Krutoy Ovrag (Russian: Крутой Овраг) is a rural locality (a village) in Tolpukhovskoye Rural Settlement, Sobinsky District, Vladimir Oblast, Russia. The population was 1 as of 2010.

== Geography ==
Krutoy Ovrag is located 30 km northeast of Sobinka (the district's administrative centre) by road. Azikovo is the nearest rural locality.
