= Krutoy, Volgograd Oblast =

Krutoy Крутой
- Khutor
- Location within Volgograd Oblast Location within Russia
- Coordinates: 49°52′N 42°18′E
- Country: Russia
- Region: Volgograd Oblast
- District: Kumylzhensky District
- Time zone: UTC+4:00

Krutoy (Russian: Крутой) is a rural locality (a khutor) in Slashchyovskoye Rural Settlement, Kumylzhensky District, Volgograd Oblast, Russia. The population was 47 as of 2010. There are 2 streets.

== Geography ==
Krutoy is located in forest steppe, on Khopyorsko-Buzulukskaya Plain, on the bank of the Khopyor River, 32 km west of Kumylzhenskaya (the district's administrative centre) by road. Slashchevskaya is the nearest rural locality.
