= Ozerki, Voronezh Oblast =

Ozerki Озерки
- Selo
- Location within Voronezh Oblast Location within Russia
- Coordinates: 50°59′N 40°28′E
- Country: Russia
- Region: Voronezh Oblast
- District: Buturlinovsky District
- Time zone: UTC+3:00

Ozerki (Russian: Озерки) is a rural locality (a selo) and the administrative center of Ozerskoye Rural Settlement, Buturlinovsky District, Voronezh Oblast, Russia. The population was 742 as of 2010. There are 6 streets.

== Geography ==
Ozerki is located 22 km north of Buturlinovka (the district's administrative centre) by road. Orlovka is the nearest rural locality.
