= Ozerki, Ilovlinsky District, Volgograd Oblast =

Ozerki Озерки
- Khutor
- Location within Volgograd Oblast Location within Russia
- Coordinates: 49°24′N 43°46′E
- Country: Russia
- Region: Volgograd Oblast
- District: Ilovlinsky District
- Time zone: UTC+4:00

Ozerki (Russian: Озерки) is a rural locality (a khutor) and the administrative center of Ozerskoye Rural Settlement, Ilovlinsky District, Volgograd Oblast, Russia. The population was 691 in 2010. There are 10 streets.

== Geography ==
Ozerki is located in steppe, 34 km northwest of Ilovlya (the district's administrative centre) by road. Viltov is the nearest rural locality.
