= Ozerki, Fatezhsky District, Kursk Oblast =

Rural locality in Kursk Oblast, Russia

Ozerki Озерки
- Village
- Interactive map of Ozerki
- Location of Ozerki Ozerki (Kursk Oblast)
- Coordinates: 52°00′45″N 35°50′07″E
- Country: Russia
- Federal subject: Kursk Oblast
- Administrative district: Fatezhsky District
- SelsovietSelsoviet: Verkhnekhotemlsky

Population (2010 Census)
  - Total: 10
  - Estimate (2010): 10 (0%)

Municipal status
  - Municipal district: Fatezhsky Municipal District
  - Rural settlement: Verkhnekhotemlsky Selsoviet Rural Settlement
- Time zone: UTC+3 (MSK)
- Postal code: 307115
- Dialing code: +7 47144
- OKTMO ID: 38644420151
- Website: моверхнехотемльский.рф

Ozerki (Russian: Озерки) is a rural locality (Russian: деревня, lit. 'village') in Verkhnekhotemlsky Selsoviet Rural Settlement, Fatezhsky District, Kursk Oblast, Russia. The population as of 2010 is 10.

== Geography ==
The village is located on the Gryazny Brook in the basin of the Svapa, 100 km from the Russia–Ukraine border, 39 km north-west of Kursk, 8.5 km south-west of the district center – the town Fatezh, 3 km from the selsoviet center – Verkhny Khoteml.

=== Climate ===
Ozerki has a warm-summer humid continental climate (Dfb in the Köppen climate classification).

== Transport ==
Ozerki is located 4.5 km from the federal route M-2 Crimea Highway as part of the European route E105, 31 km from the road of regional importance 38K-018 (Kursk – Ponyri), 5.5 km from the road 38K-039 (Fatezh – 38K-018), 3 km from the road of intermunicipal significance 38H-181 (M2 "Crimea Highway" – Verkhny Khoteml), 35 km from the nearest railway halt 521 km (railway line Oryol – Kursk).

The rural locality is situated 42 km from Kursk Vostochny Airport, 160 km from Belgorod International Airport and 234 km from Voronezh Peter the Great Airport.
