= Ozerki, Belgorod Oblast =

Ozerki Озерки
- Selo
- Location within Belgorod Oblast Location within Russia
- Coordinates: 51°15′N 38°01′E
- Country: Russia
- Region: Belgorod Oblast
- District: Starooskolsky District
- Time zone: UTC+3:00

Ozerki (Russian: Озерки) is a rural locality (a selo) in Starooskolsky District, Belgorod Oblast, Russia. The population was 774 as of 2010. There are 53 streets.

== Geography ==
Ozerki is located 17 km southeast of Stary Oskol (the district's administrative centre) by road. Chernikovo is the nearest rural locality.
