= Kamenolomni =

Kamenolomni Каменоломни
- Urban-type settlement
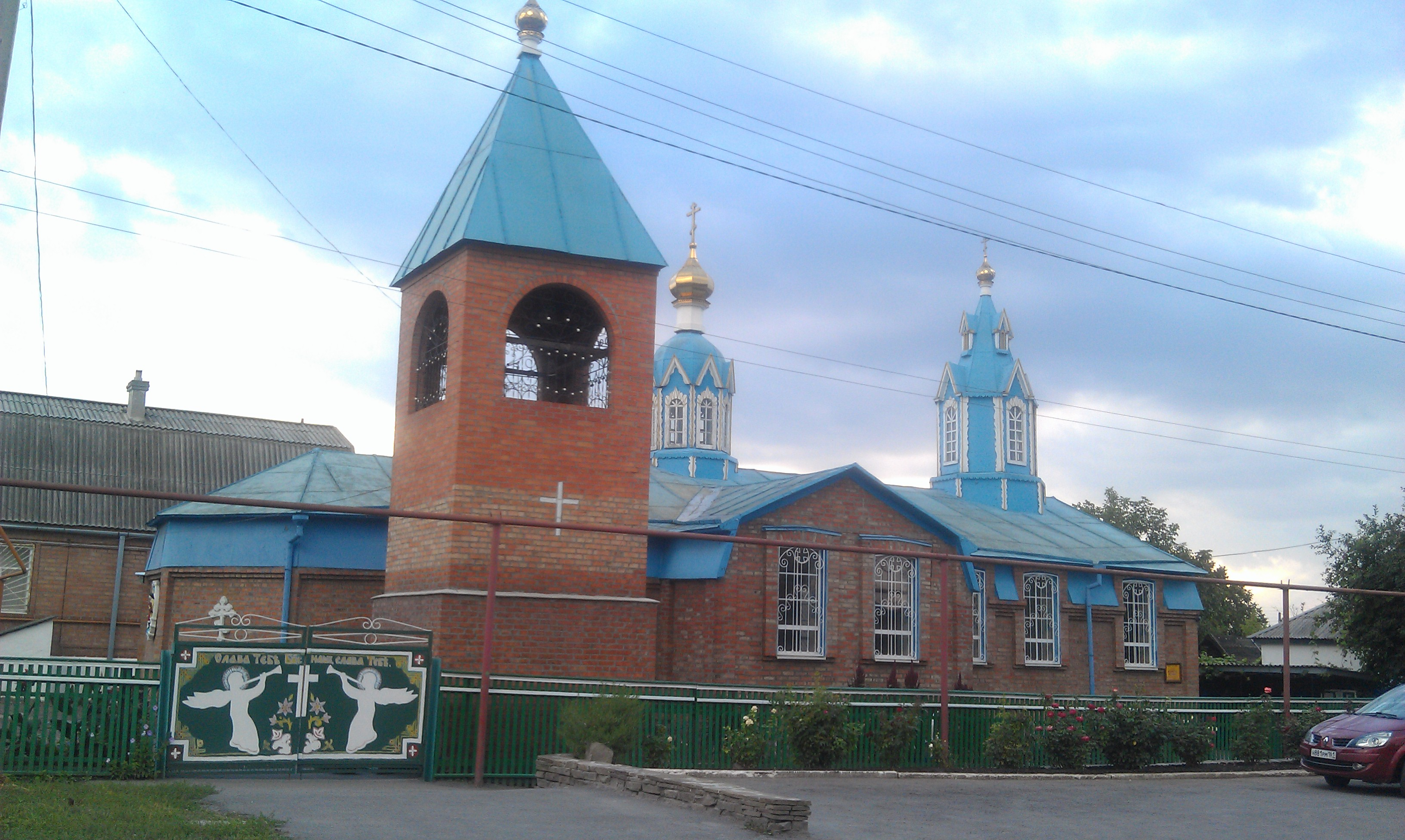
- Church of Michael the Archangel

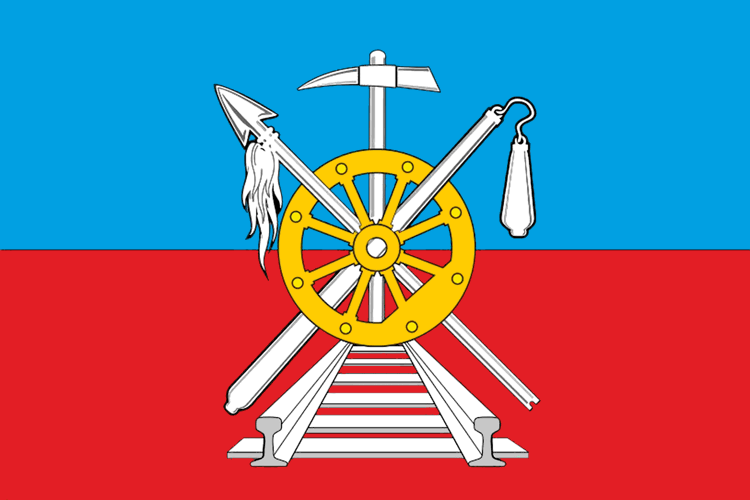
- Flag
- Interactive map of Kamenolomni
- Location of Kamenolomni Kamenolomni (European Russia) Kamenolomni (Russia)
- Coordinates: 47.6691°N 40.2053°E
- Country: Russia
- Federal subject: Rostov Oblast
- Administrative district: Oktyabrsky District
- Founded: 1 May 1902

Population (2010 Census)
  - Total: 11,247
  - Estimate (2021): 12,327 (+9.6%)
- Time zone: UTC+3 (MSK)
- Postal codes: 346470, 346480
- OKTMO ID: 60641151051

Kamenolomni (Russian: Каменоломни) is an urban locality (an urban-type settlement) in Oktyabrsky District of Rostov Oblast, Russia. Population: 11,247 (2010 census); 12,281 (2002 census); 12,410 (1989 Soviet census).

== History ==
Kamenolomni was administratively part of the Donets Governorate of Ukraine from 1920 to 1924. Afterwards it was annexed into the North Caucasus Krai of Russia within the Soviet Union.
