= Malye Ozerki, Vologda Oblast =

Village in Sokolsky District, Vologda Oblast, Russia

Malye Ozerki Малые Озерки
- Village
- Location within Vologda Oblast Location within Russia
- Coordinates: 59°35′N 39°53′E
- Country: Russia
- Region: Vologda Oblast
- District: Sokolsky District
- Time zone: UTC+3:00

Malye Ozerki (Russian: Малые Озерки) is a rural locality (a village) in Arkhangelskoye Rural Settlement, Sokolsky District, Vologda Oblast, Russia. The population was 6 as of 2002.

== Geography ==
The distance to Sokol is 19 km, to Arkhangelskoye is 4 km. Bolshiye Ozerki is the nearest rural locality.
