= Kuybyshevo, Rostov Oblast =

Kuybyshevo Куйбышево
- Selo
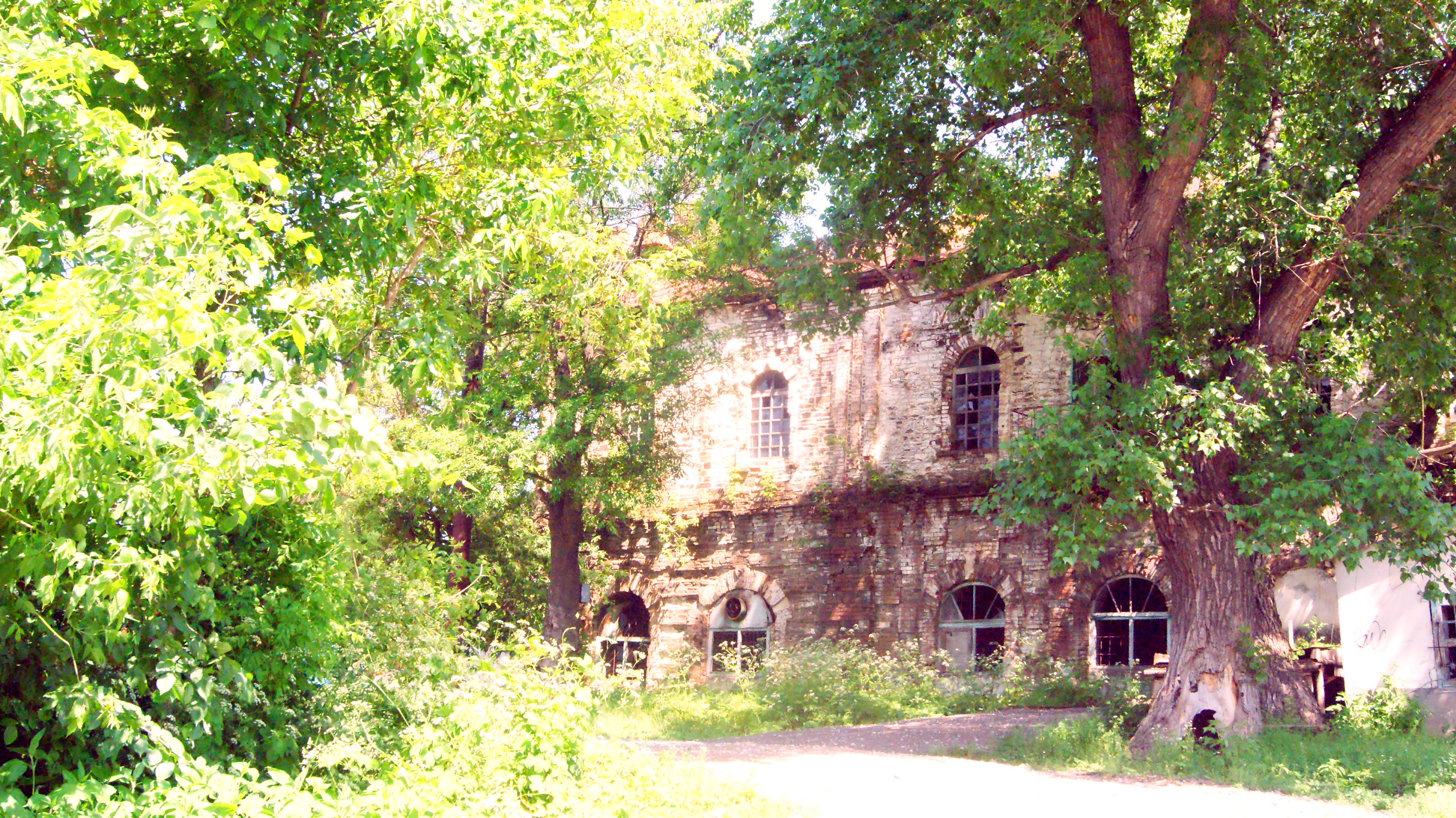
- Old mill
- Interactive map of Kuybyshevo
- Location of Kuybyshevo Kuybyshevo (European Russia) Kuybyshevo (Russia)
- Coordinates: 47°49′06″N 38°54′30″E
- Country: Russia
- Federal subject: Rostov Oblast
- Administrative district: Kuybyshevsky District

Population (2010 Census)
  - Total: 6,145
  - Estimate (2010): 6,145 (0%)
- Time zone: UTC+3 (MSK)
- Postal code: 346940
- OKTMO ID: 60627405101

Kuybyshevo (Russian: Куйбышево) is a rural locality (a selo) in Kuybyshevsky District of Rostov Oblast, Russia. Population: 6,145 (2010 census); 5,799 (2002 census). It is also the administrative center of Kuybyshevsky District.

== Geography ==
Kuybyshevo is located on the left bank of Mius River. It is close to the border with Ukraine. The Ukrainian territory on the other side of the border is de facto controlled by Russia.

== History ==
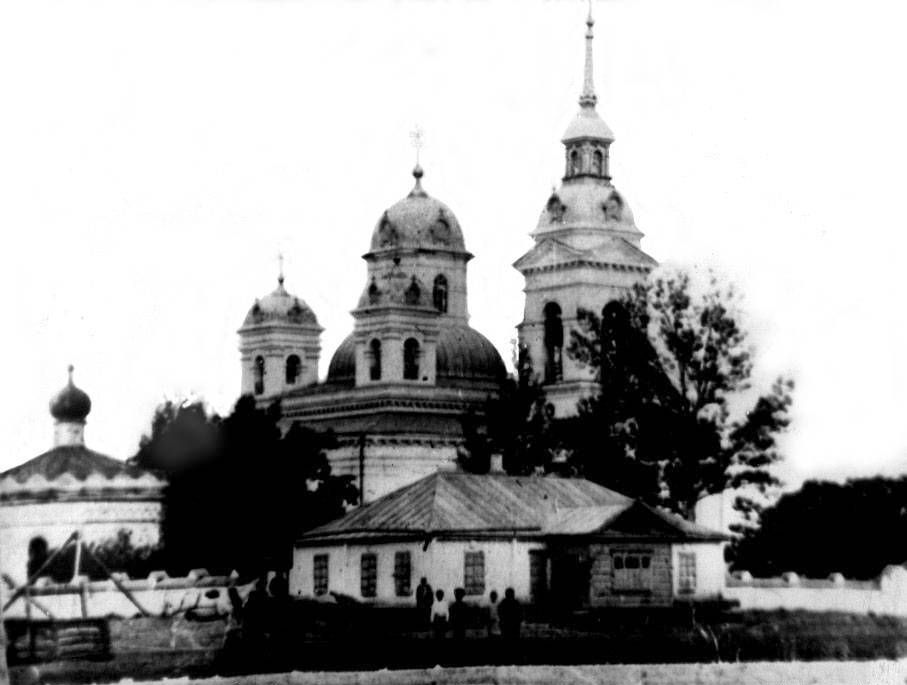
St. Nicholas church in the early 20th century

The predecessor of the modern selo of Kuybyshevo was Golodayevka sloboda, which was founded in 1777 by colonel Dmitry Martynov.

In April 1820, the region was the location of the largest peasant uprising in the 19th century in Russia, the Martynovsky Riot. With about 30,000 participants, it was the second largest insurrection after that of Pugachev. In July of the same year the revolt was suppressed by general Alexander Chernyshyov, and about four thousand peasants were arrested.

During the Russian Civil War the fighting took place in the area. Golodaevka was taken by Red Army forces led by Nikolay Kuybyshev. It was administratively part of the Donets Governorate of Ukraine from 1920 to 1924. In 1935 Golodaevka was renamed to Kuybyshevo in honor of Nikolay Kuybyshev. Three years later Kuibyshev was executed during the Great Purge, however, the name was not changed, probably because of confusion between Nikolay Kuybyshev and his brother Valerian Kuybyshev, a prominent Soviet politician who also died in 1935.

== Places of interest ==
- Saint Nicholas Church, a Russian Orthodox church built in 1860.
- Kuybyshevo Forest, a natural monument and a protected area.
