= Oktyabrsky District, Rostov Oblast =

Oktyabrsky District Октябрьский район (Russian)
- District
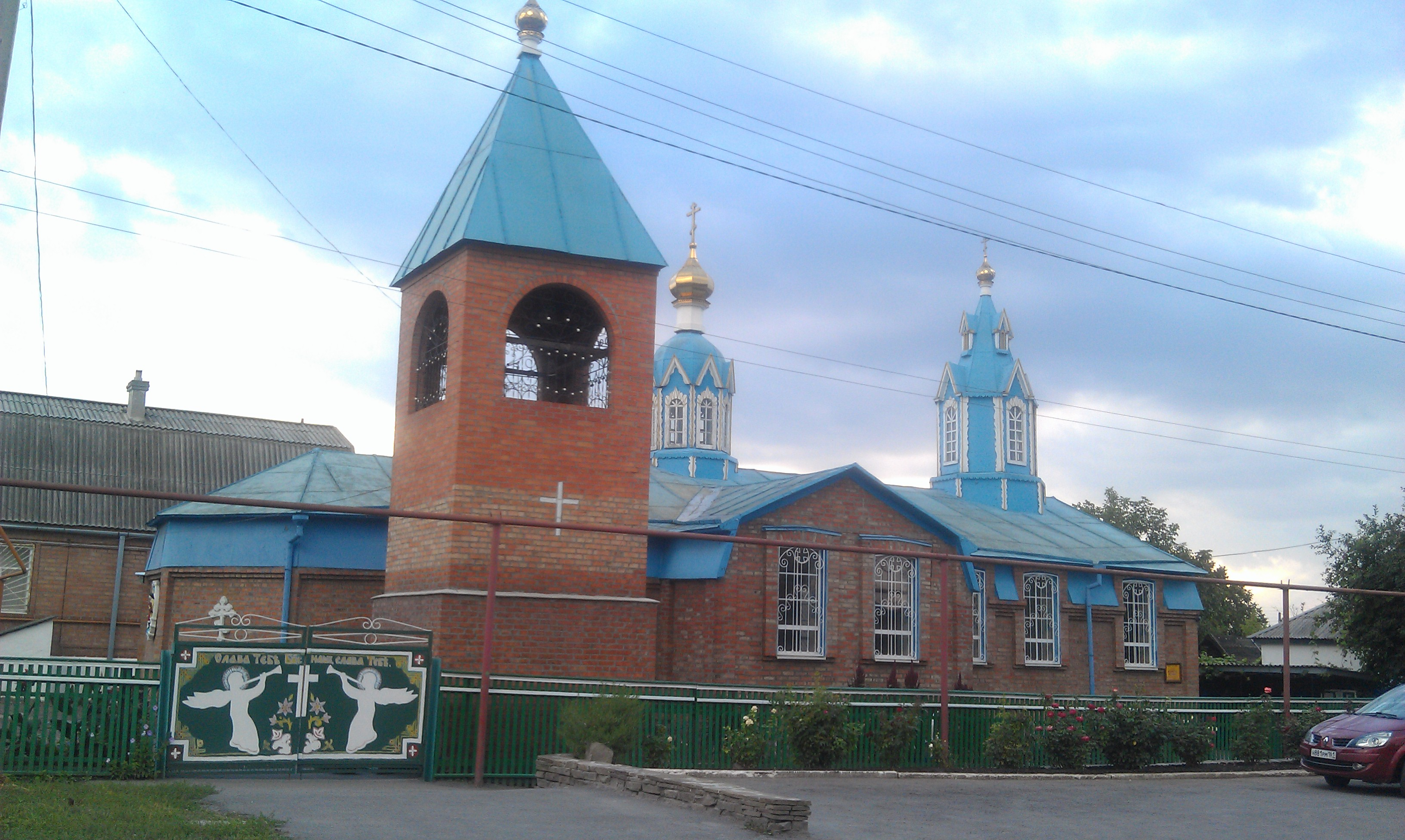
- Church of the Archangel Michael, Oktyabrsky District

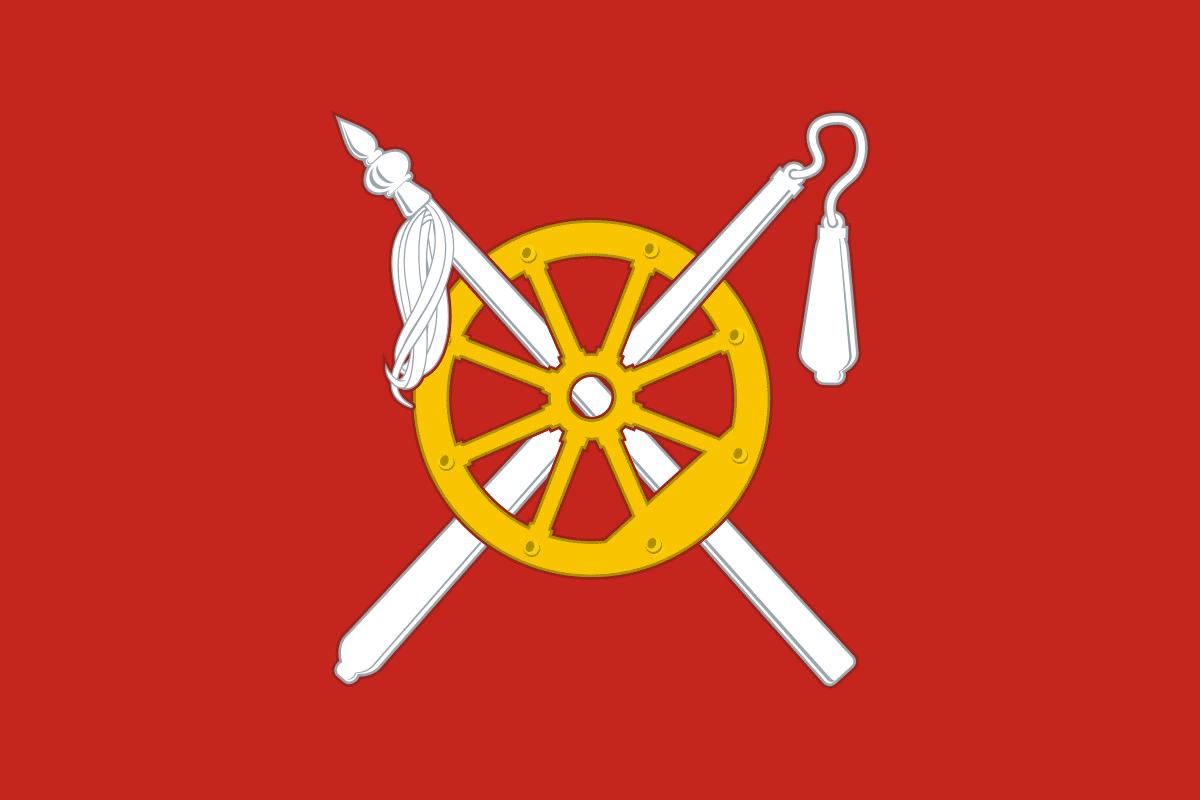
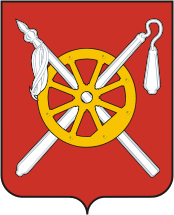
- Flag Coat of arms
- Location of Oktyabrsky District in Rostov Oblast
- Coordinates: 47°40′07″N 40°12′49″E
- Country: Russia
- Federal subject: Rostov Oblast
- Established: 1938
- Administrative center: Kamenolomni

Area
  - Total: 1,998.7 km^{2} (771.7 sq mi)

Population (2010 Census)
  - Total: 73,224
  - Density: 36.636/km^{2} (94.886/sq mi)
  - Urban: 15.4%
  - Rural: 84.6%

Administrative structure
  - Administrative divisions: 1 Urban settlements, 11 Rural settlements
  - Inhabited localities: 1 urban-type settlements, 61 rural localities

Municipal structure
  - Municipally incorporated as: Oktyabrsky Municipal District
  - Municipal divisions: 1 urban settlements, 11 rural settlements
- Time zone: UTC+3 (MSK)
- OKTMO ID: 60641000
- Website: http://www.octobdonland.ru/

Oktyabrsky District (Russian: Октя́брьский райо́н) is an administrative and municipal district, (raion), one of the forty-three in Rostov Oblast, Russia. It is located in the western central part of the oblast. The area of the district is 1,998.7 square kilometers (771.7 sq mi). Its administrative center is the urban locality (a work settlement) of Kamenolomni. Population: 73,224 (2010 Census); 78,983 (2002 census); 66,566 (1989 Soviet census). The population of Kamenolomni accounts for 15.4% of the district's total population.

== Notable residents ==
- Mikhail Biryukov, footballer, born 1987 in Krivyanskaya

== See also ==
- Church of Michael the Archangel (Kamenolomni)
