= Preobrazhenskaya, Volgograd Oblast =

Rural locality in Volgograd Oblast, Russia

Coordinates: 50°44′25″N 43°03′12″E

Preobrazhenskaya (Russian: Преображенская) is a rural locality (a stanitsa) and the administrative center of Kikvidzensky District of Volgograd Oblast, Russia. Population: 5,533 (2010 census); 5,463 (2002 census); 5,135 (1989 Soviet census).
