= Kikvidzensky District =

Kikvidzensky District Киквидзенский район (Russian)
- District
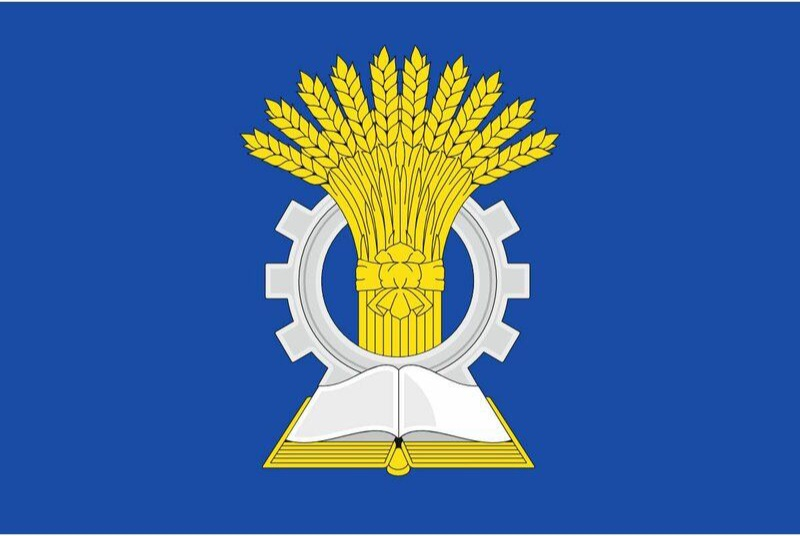
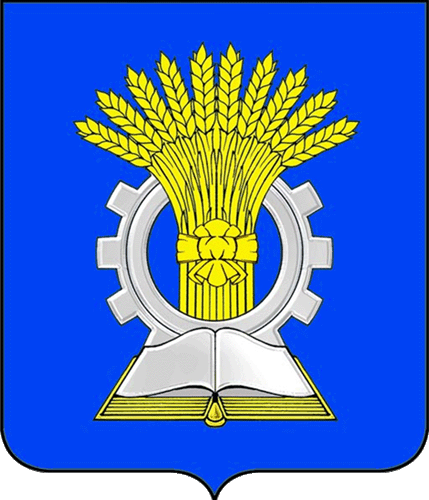
- Flag Coat of arms
- Location of Kikvidzensky District in Volgograd Oblast
- Coordinates: 50°44′N 43°03′E
- Country: Russia
- Federal subject: Volgograd Oblast
- Established: 12 July 1928
- Administrative center: Preobrazhenskaya

Area
  - Total: 2,120 km^{2} (820 sq mi)

Population (2010 Census)
  - Total: 17,669
  - Density: 8.33/km^{2} (21.6/sq mi)
  - Urban: 0%
  - Rural: 100%

Administrative structure
  - Administrative divisions: 12 selsoviet
  - Inhabited localities: 35 rural localities

Municipal structure
  - Municipally incorporated as: Kikvidzensky Municipal District
  - Municipal divisions: 0 urban settlements, 11 rural settlements
- Time zone: UTC+3 (MSK)
- OKTMO ID: 18620000
- Website: http://rakikv.ru/nash-raion.html

Kikvidzensky District (Russian: Кикви́дзенский райо́н) is an administrative district (raion), one of the thirty-three in Volgograd Oblast, Russia. Municipally, it is incorporated as Kikvidzensky Municipal District. It is located in the northwest of the oblast. The area of the district is 2,120 square kilometers (820 sq mi). Its administrative center is the rural locality (a stanitsa) of Preobrazhenskaya. Population: 17,669 (2010 census); 18,860 (2002 Census); 18,732 (1989 Soviet census). The population of Preobrazhenskaya accounts for 31.3% of the district's total population.
