= Monument to Aleksei Shein =

Coordinates: 47.1119°N 39.4239°E

- Памятник А.М. Шеину
- Interactive map of Monument to Aleksei Shein
- Location: Azov, Rostov Oblast, Russia
- Material: bronze, granite
- Opening date: 2009
- Dedicated to: Aleksei Semenovich Shein

Monument to Aleksei Shein (Russian: Памятник А.М. Шеину) ― is a sculpture of Russian statesman, general, Boyar (from 1695), and the first Russian Generalissimo (1696) Aleksei Semenovich Shein. It is situated in the city of Azov, Rostov Oblast, Russia.

Aleksei Shein participated in the Crimean campaigns and suppressed Streltsy Uprising on the order of Peter the Great. For the battles he won while being Azov commander he received the highest military rank.

The monument was opened on June 12, 2009. The authors of the project were M. Lushnikov and V.P. Mokrousov.

The bronze figure of Aleksei Shein was mounted on a pedestal at the historical center of Azov. The general is depicted standing with a sword in one hand, while his foot rests on a stone of the fortress. The height of the monument with pedestal is about 5 meters. The inscription on the monument reads: Aleksei Shein, the first Russian generalissimo (1652-1700).

Together with the monument to Peter the Great, Azov fortress and Azov local history museum, it forms an architectural complex dedicated to Russian and Azov history.

== See also ==
- List of monuments and memorials in Azov
