= Monument to the sailors of the Azov Flotilla =

World War II monument in Azov, Russia

- Russian: Памятник морякам Азовской военной флотилии
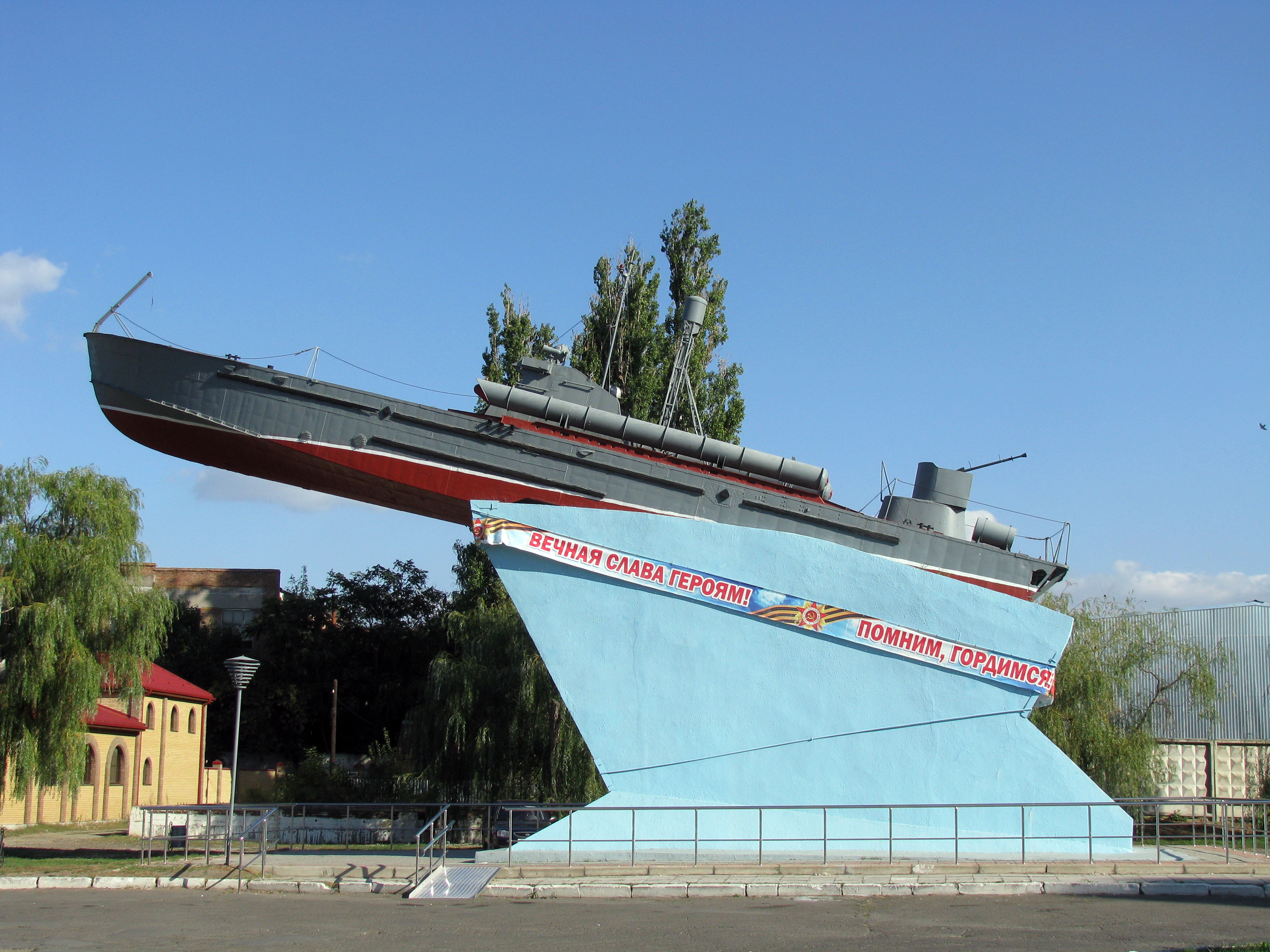
- Interactive map of Monument to the sailors of the Azov Flotilla
- Location: Azov Fortress in Azov, Rostov Oblast, Russia
- Coordinates: 47°07′04″N 39°25′20″E
- Designer: A. Ivanov, G. Stultsev
- Type: Monument
- Material: Metal, concrete
- Opening date: 1975

The Monument to the Sailors of the Azov Flotilla (Russian: Памятник морякам Азовской военной флотилии) is a historical memorial dedicated to those in the Azov Flotilla who fought in Taganrog Bay and the Don Delta during World War II (Eastern Front). The monument is located in Azov, Rostov oblast, Russia, and is a part of the Russian Cultural Heritage Register as an object of local cultural heritage.

The monument consists of a torpedo boat of Komsomolets-class installed on a concrete pedestal, a replica of the type of boat sailors of the Azov Flotilla helmed.

The memorial, designed by architects A. Ivanov and G. Stultsev, is located in the center of Azov near the river port and fortress. In front of the pedestal, there is a marble slab with the following inscription:

"This ship has been preserved as a museum at the bank of the Quiet Don to the memory of the menacing and harsh battles of the Azov Flotilla during 1941-1942."

Commissioned by the Executive Committee Council of National Deputies in 1975, the opening ceremony took place on 7 May 1975.

== Historical background ==
For 680 days, the Wehrmacht had occupied the city of Taganrog. From October 1942 through July 1942, the Don military group of the Azov Flotilla was in Azov, Russia. This group defended the Don Delta and the coast of Taganrog Bay with the use of the Armoured Train Za Rodinu 'For the Motherland', River Gunboats, Patrol Boats, and the coast battery. (No. 660, 40th Artillery Battalion).

The paratroopers of the Azov Flotilla landed on August 30, 1943, near Taganrog. The operation aimed to retake German-occupied Taganrog. After the capture of Azov and Azovsky District by the German forces, the Azov Flotilla relocated to the Black Sea near Novorossiysk, where battles of a lodgement near cape Myskhako (Malaya Zemlya (Russian: Малая Земля, lit. "Minor Land")) continued.

During the Second World War, approximately 1,500 sailors of the Azov Flotilla received medals and orders, including Caesar Kunikov, who received the title Hero of the Soviet Union.

== See also ==
- List of monuments and memorials in Azov

== Literature ==
- Михайлушкин П. Морякам Азовской военной флотилии/П. Михайлушкин //Красное Приазовье. – 1984. – 1 августа
- Чумак, Т. Героическим морякам. Газ. Читай-Азов. 2008. – 5 августа.
