= House of Kovalev =

Coordinates: 47°06′42″N 39°25′27″E

- Дом Ковалева (Russian)
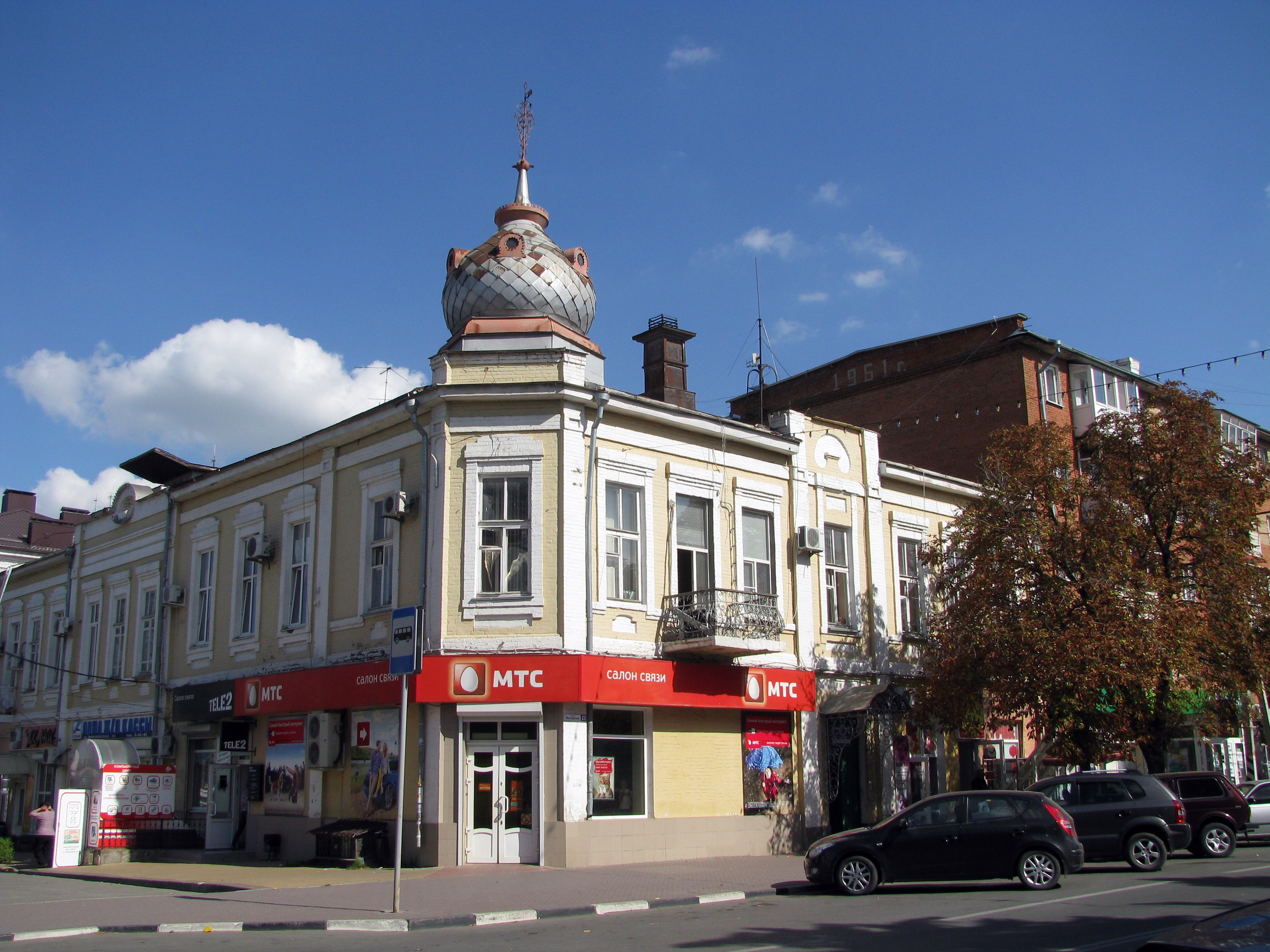
- House of Kovalev

- Location within Russia
- Type: Registered cultural heritage building
- Location: 23 Moskovskaya Street

History
- Built: 1912

Site notes
- Area: Azov, Rostov oblast, Russia

The House of Kovalev is a registered cultural heritage building located in Azov, Russia. The building stands at 23 Moskovskaya Street. The building is listed in the State Code of Particularly Valuable Objects of Cultural Heritage of the Peoples of the Russian Federation.

== History ==
The building is named after G. I. Kovalev, its original owner. The building was constructed in 1912, located towards the opposite of the Azov Museum of History, Archaeology and Palaeontology. Kovalev operated a general store there. A mechanical workshop operated out of the building.

Throughout the period of Soviet rule, the building served various municipal functions, including as a registry office, a commercial warehouse, and a state-run bank.

The building currently houses a Mobile TeleSystems (MTS) store.

== Description ==
The building's architecture is characterized by high ceilings, large windows, and balconies that are decorated with wrought-iron patterns.
