= Vladimir Lenin monument, Azov =

Monument in Azov

Vladimir Lenin monument
- Russian: Памятник В. И. Ленину в городе Азове
- Interactive map of Vladimir Lenin monument
- Location: Azov, Rostov Oblast, Russia
- Coordinates: 47°06′49″N 39°25′31″E
- Height: 10.8 m (35 ft)
- Opening date: 30 April 1978

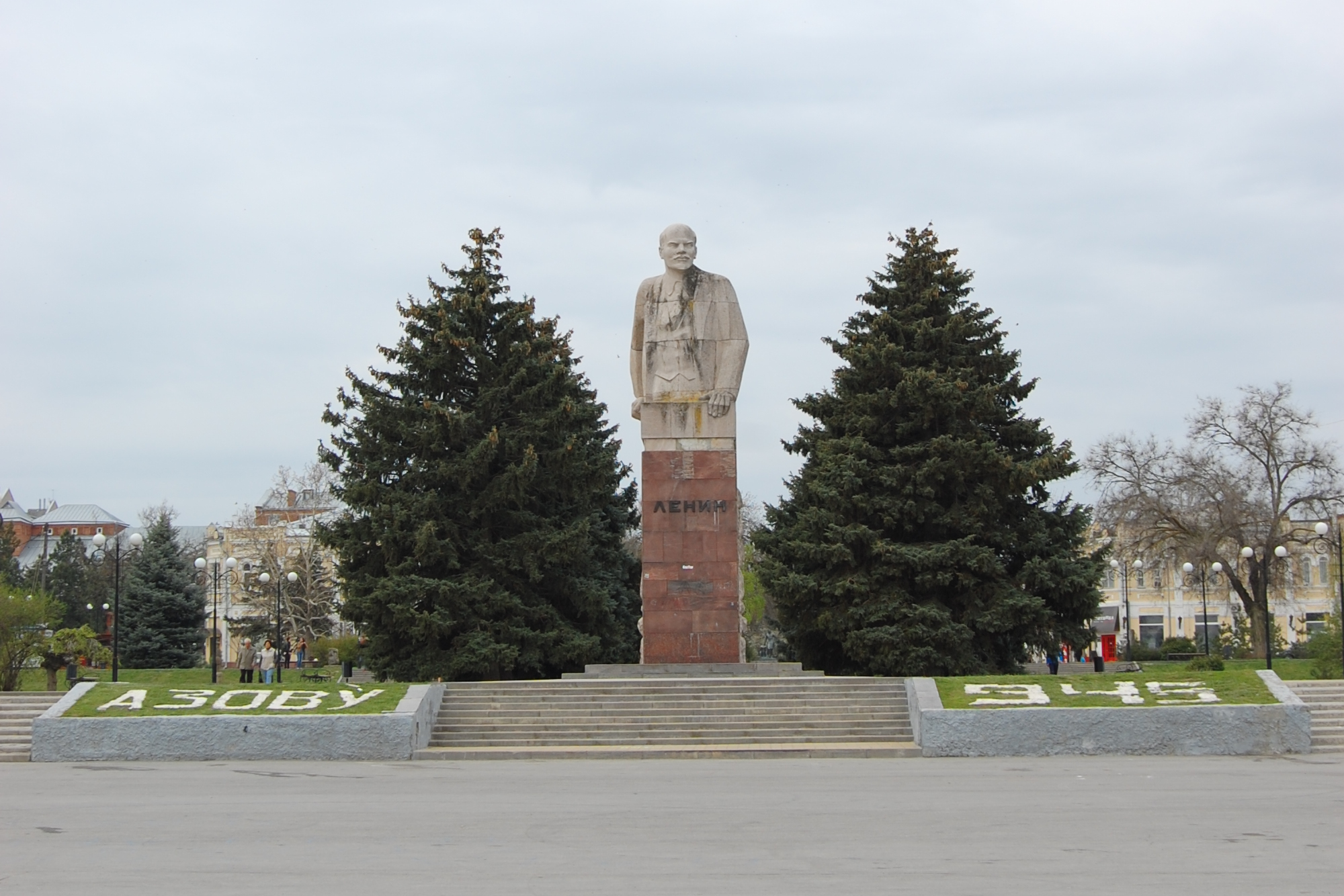

Vladimir Lenin monument in Azov (Russian: Памятник В. И. Ленину в городе Азове) is a monument dedicated the founder of USSR Vladimir Lenin which is situated in the city of Azov, Rostov Oblast, Russia. It is officially declared as an object of cultural heritage of regional importance.

== History ==
The monument was opened on 30 April 1978, several days after the 108th anniversary Lenin's birthday. When the monument was being constructed, at the same time, the square around it was also being renovated according to the project of the city's chief architect Vladimir Fomenko and the chairman of the Azov city executive committee Anatoly Ivanov.

The authors of the monument were sculptor Yuri Orekhov and architects Vladimir Peterburzhtsev and Alexander Stepanov. The monument is presented in the form of a half-figure (which is not typical for other monuments dedicated to Lenin) carved from natural Azerbaijani granite. The total height of the monument is 10.8 meters: the height of the rostrum is 5.3 meters, and the height of the pedestal is 5.5 meters. The pedestal is lined with polished granite.

General work on the construction of the monument was conducted by a team of stonemasons from Russian Monumental Art Association, Moscow and by workers of the Azov city repair and construction management. The metal letters on the pedestal were made by the Azov Optical and Mechanical Plant.

== See also ==
- List of monuments and memorials in Azov
