= Monument to Heroes of World War I (Azov) =

- Памятник героям Первой мировой войны
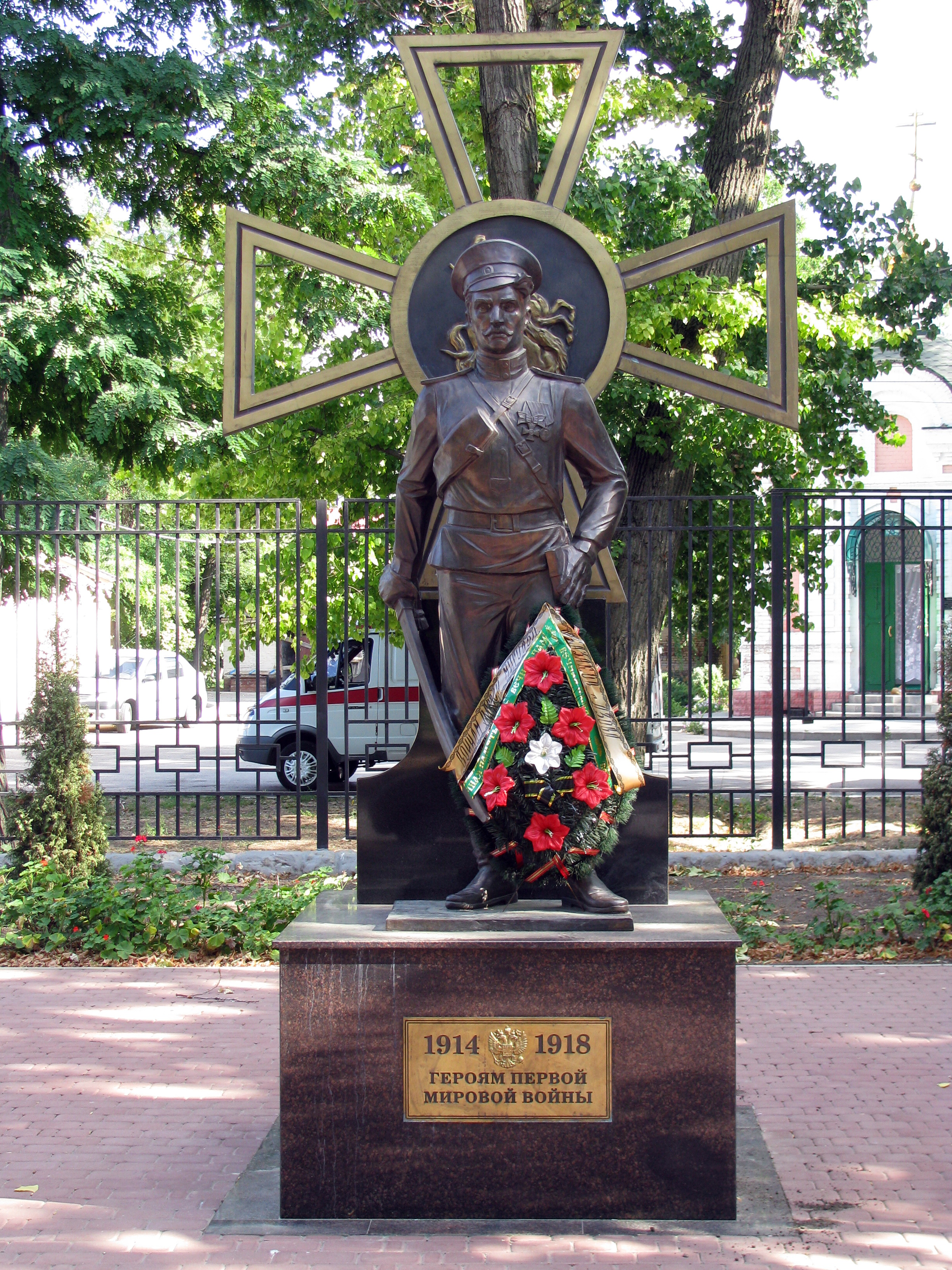
- Interactive map of Monument to Heroes of World War I
- Location: Azov, Rostov Oblast, Russia
- Designer: A. M. Dementiev
- Material: bronze, granite
- Height: 2 metres (6.6 ft)
- Beginning date: 2014
- Completion date: 2014
- Opening date: 30 July 2014

Monument to heroes of the First World War (Russian: Памятник героям Первой мировой войны) is one of the monuments in the city of Azov, Rostov Oblast, Russia. It is dedicated to the soldiers and officers of the Russian Imperial Army who fought in the First World War. It was erected in 2014 and is situated at Petrovsky Boulevard.

== History ==
About 125,000 Don Cossacks, who formed sixty cavalry regiments, thirty-three horse batteries, six infantry battalions, five reserve regiments, three reserve batteries and more than eighty separate special hundreds took part in the battles of the First World War. They participated in almost every major operation at the Russian front.

The upcoming anniversary of the beginning of the war has aroused public interest in Russia to commemorate the memory of its heroes. Work on the monument in Azov began in 2012. The sculpture was cast in February 2014.

The monument itself is a figure of a standing Cossack and Saint George Cross, the symbol of military merits, behind him. In his right hand the Cossack holds a sword, and in the left one - a scabbard from a saber. The sad pose of the Cossack corresponds to the out of the First World War for Russia. The monument is set on a granite pedestal. It was designed by sculptor A. M. Dementiev.

The height of the sculpture of the Cossack is two meters. The three-meter St. George cross is made of bronze and brass. Granite for the pedestal was brought from Karelia and Ukraine. The monument was erected at the donation of Azov dwellers.

The solemn opening of the monument took place on 30 July 2014.

== See also ==
- List of monuments and memorials in Azov
