= Bust of Lenin (Taganrog) =

Landmark in Azov, Rostov, Russia

Coordinates: 47°12′56″N 38°55′41″E

- Бюст Ленина (Таганрог) (Russian)
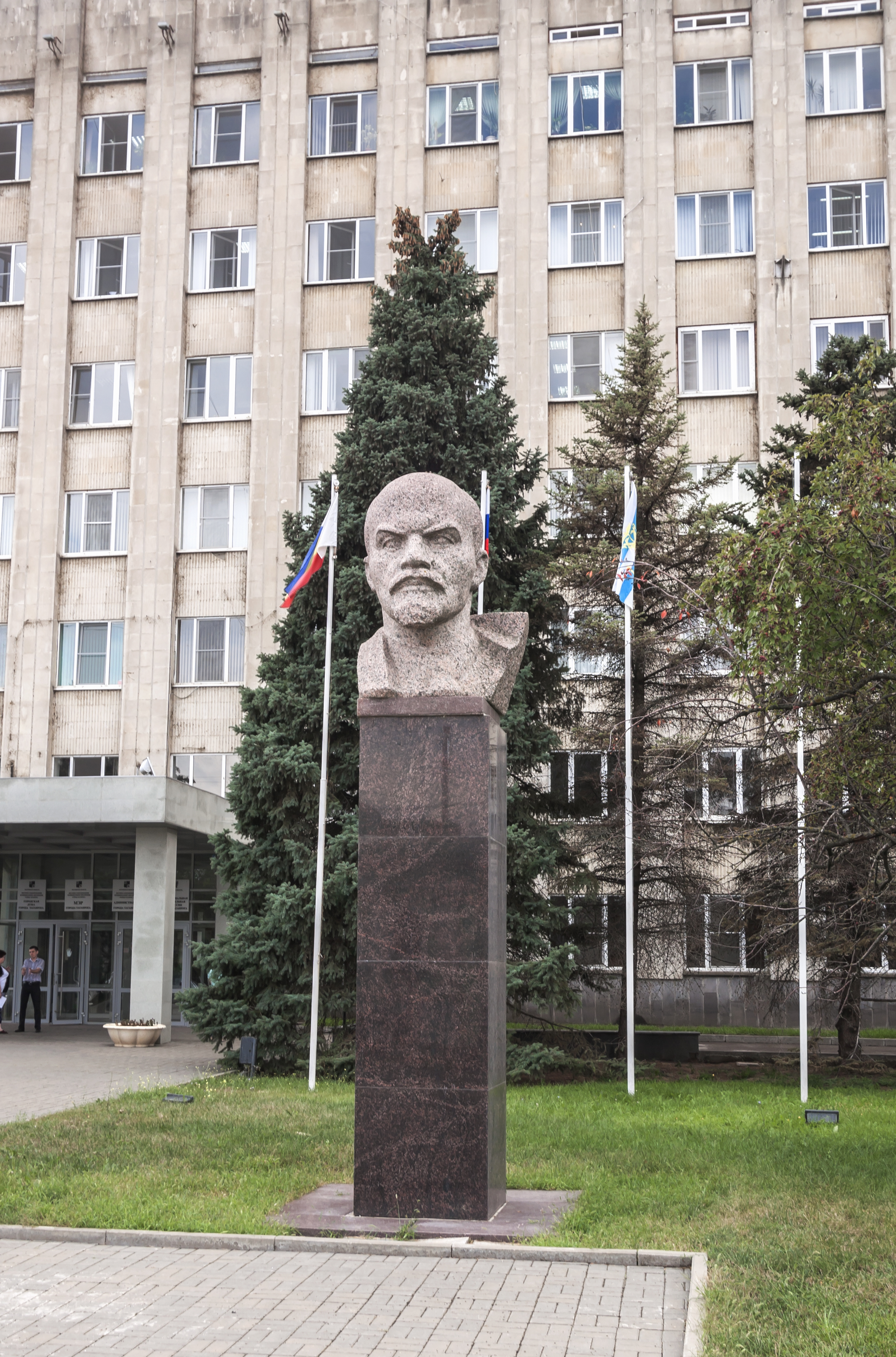
- Monument to Lenin 3746

- Location within Russia
- Type: landmark
- Location: Azov, Rostov oblast Russia

History
- Built: 2006

Site notes
- Architect: B.A Plenkin

The Bust of Lenin is a sculptural image of Lenin, erected in 1978 in front of the Taganrog City Administration. The Lenin bust is installed in front of the Administration building of Taganrog City (73 Petrovskaya St.), and was built in 1978. The sculptor is B.A. Plenkin, and architect S. Tserkovnikov.

== History ==
On December 17, 2013, the Committee of Architecture and Town Planning of Taganrog, at a meeting of the Standing Committee of the City Council of Taganrog on Budget, Taxes and Economic Policy the deputies were presented with the initiative of the chief architect of Taganrog Olga Shcherbakova to place the "City of Military Glory" on Petrovskaya Street, in front of the Administration of Taganrog.

In February 2014 it was announced that the City Planning Council and the chief architect Olga Shcherbakova made a preliminary decision to place the stele near the City Hall. In this regard, the fate of the bust of Vladimir Lenin remained in question.

In August 2014 the citizens of Taganrog were astonished by the method that the city administration used to repair the cladding of the bust pedestal. The granite slabs on the pedestal were fixed with clerical tape.
