= List of monuments and memorials in Azov =

This is a list of monuments and memorials located in Azov.

== Military monuments and memorials ==
- Monument to Heroes of World War I
- Monument to the sailors of the Azov Flotilla

== Monuments and memorials to people ==
=== Militaries ===
- Monument to Alexander Suvorov

=== Politicians ===
- Monument to Aleksei Shein
- Monument to Peter the Great
- Monument to Vladimir Lenin
