= Azov Museum of History, Archaeology and Palaeontology =

Museum in Azov, Rostov, Russia

Coordinates: 47.1117°N 39.4236°E

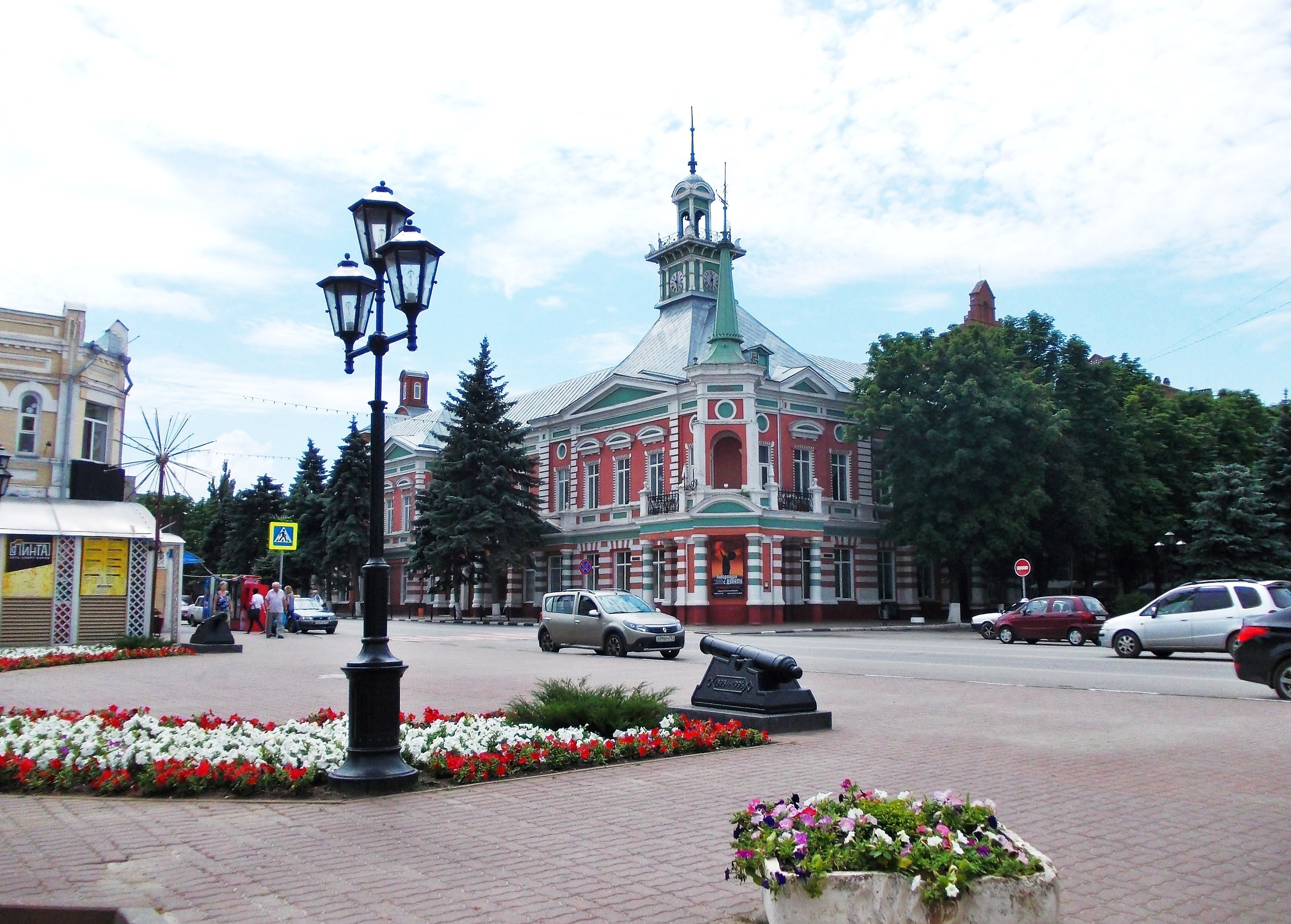
Building of Azov Museum

The Azov Museum of History, Archaeology and Palaeontology (Russian: Азовский историко-археологический и палеонтологический музей-заповедник) in Azov, Rostov oblast, is a museum reserve in Russia. It is one of the largest museums in the south of Russia, particularly notable for its palaeontological collection.

== History ==
The museum was first opened on 17 May 1917 by the efforts of Mikhail Aronovich Makarovskiy and the town's civic society, and displayed small items given by the local population (old coins, postage stamps, bullets and so on), but was destroyed shortly afterwards in the Russian Revolution. It was reopened in 1937 but the collections were lost during the occupation by German troops in World War II. After the war the local people tried to revive the museum, but to do so took until 1960.

The museum occupies the premises of the old town hall. It also administers the Powder Cellar Museum.

== Exhibits ==
The palaeontological collection contains skeletons of deinotherium, woolly rhinoceros, elasmotherium and steppe bison. The museum also has two complete skeletons of steppe mammoths, a male and a female.

=== Gallery ===
Palaeontology

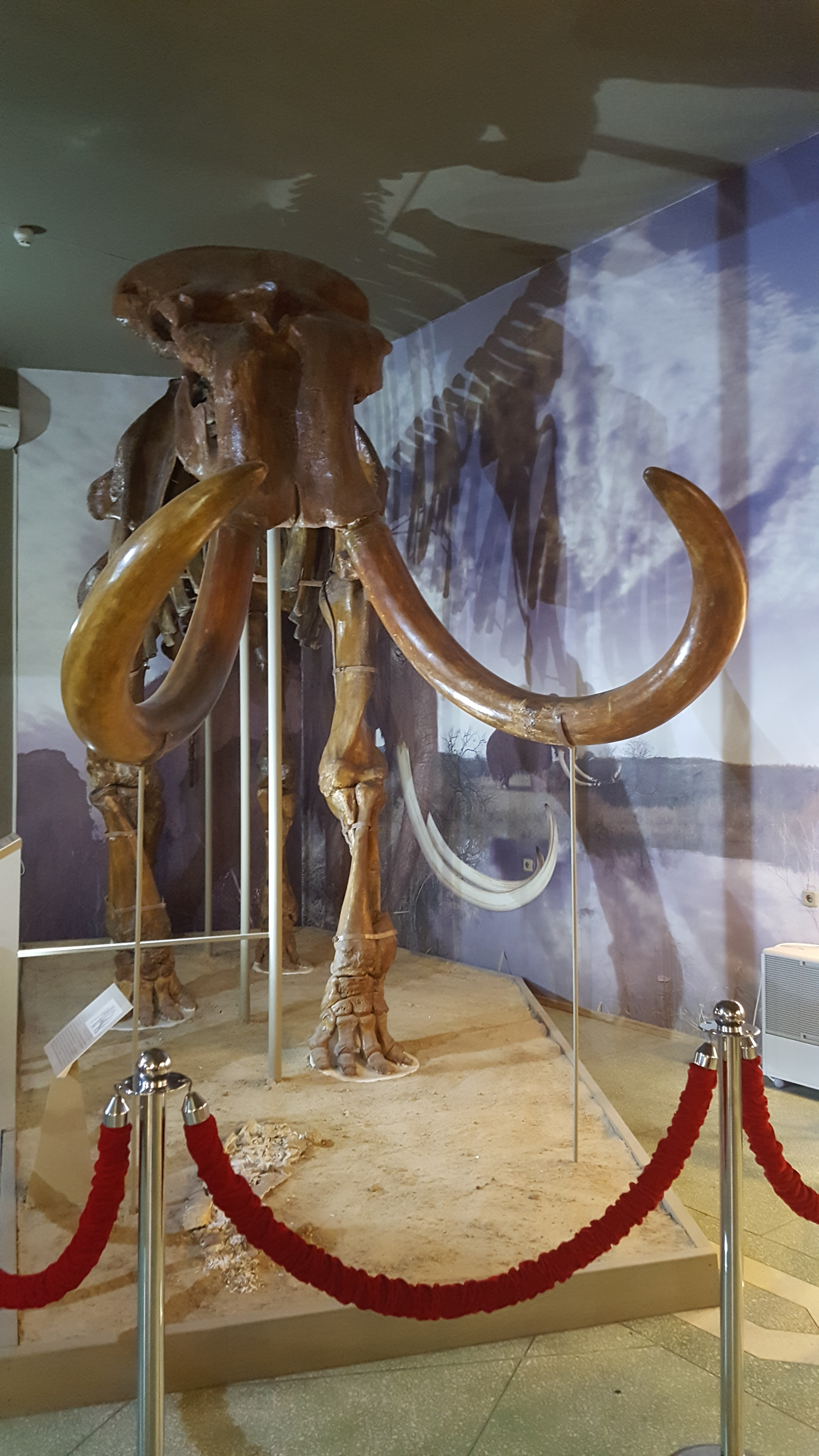
Steppe mammoth

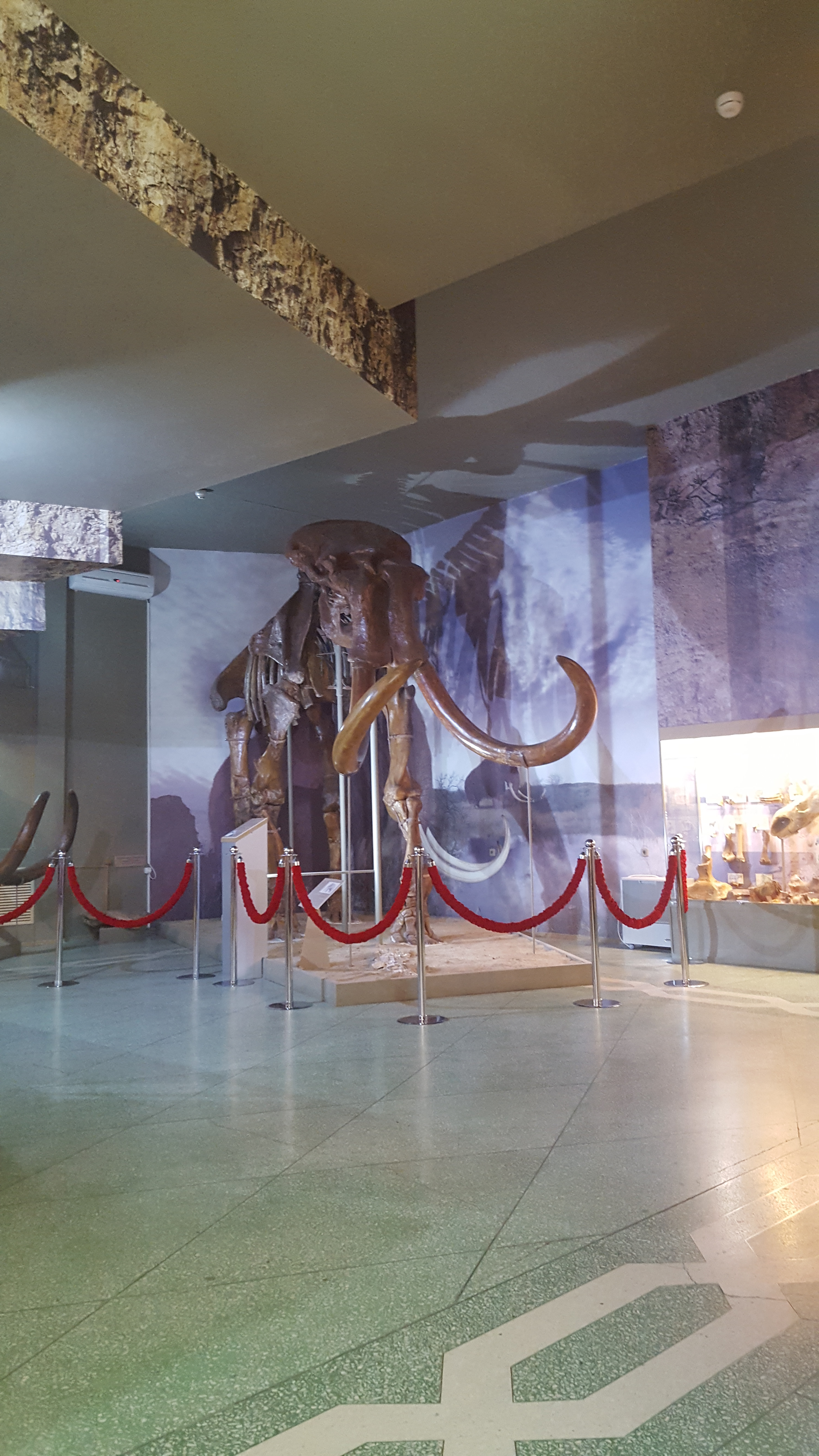
Steppe mammoth

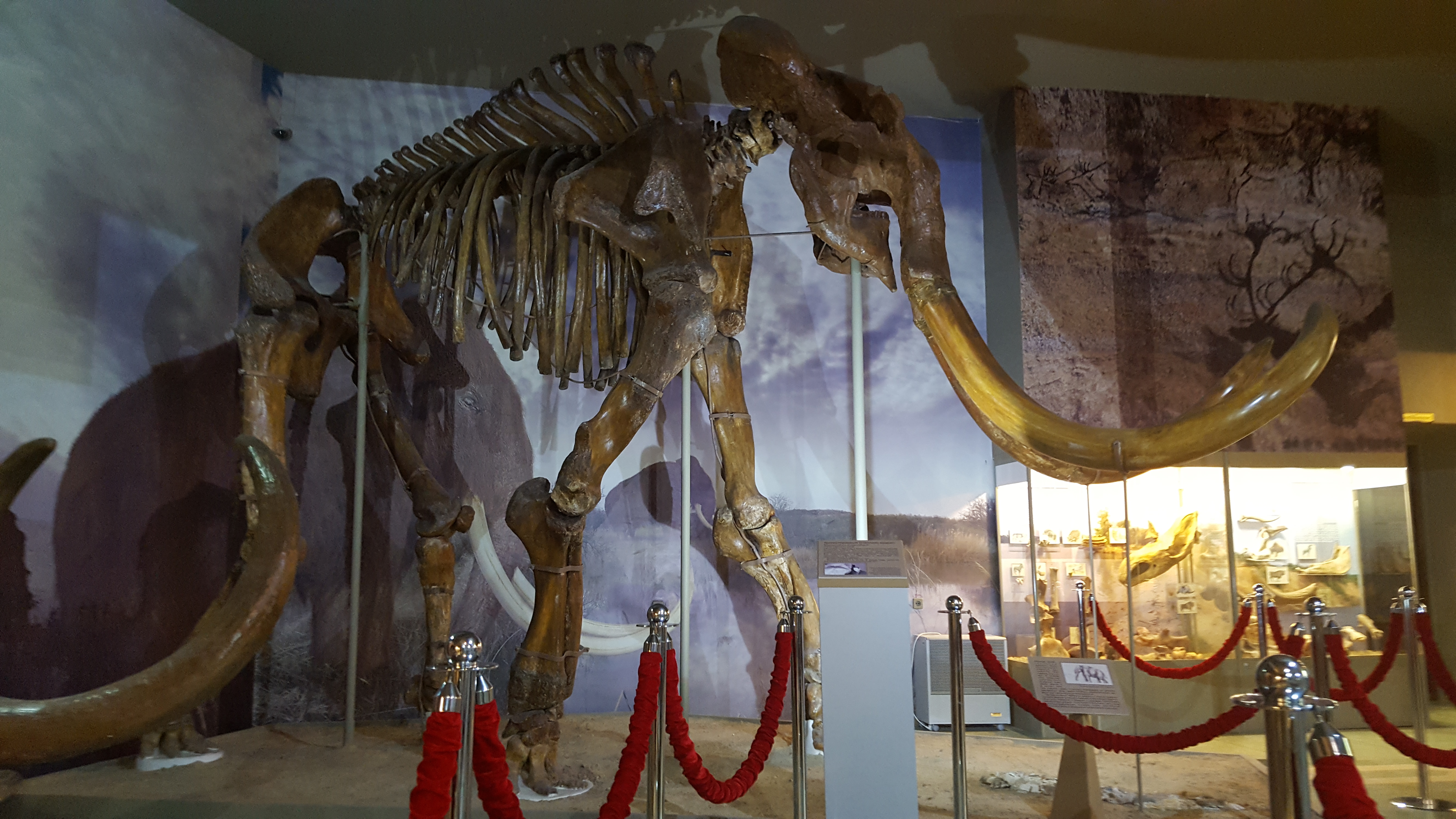
Steppe mammoth

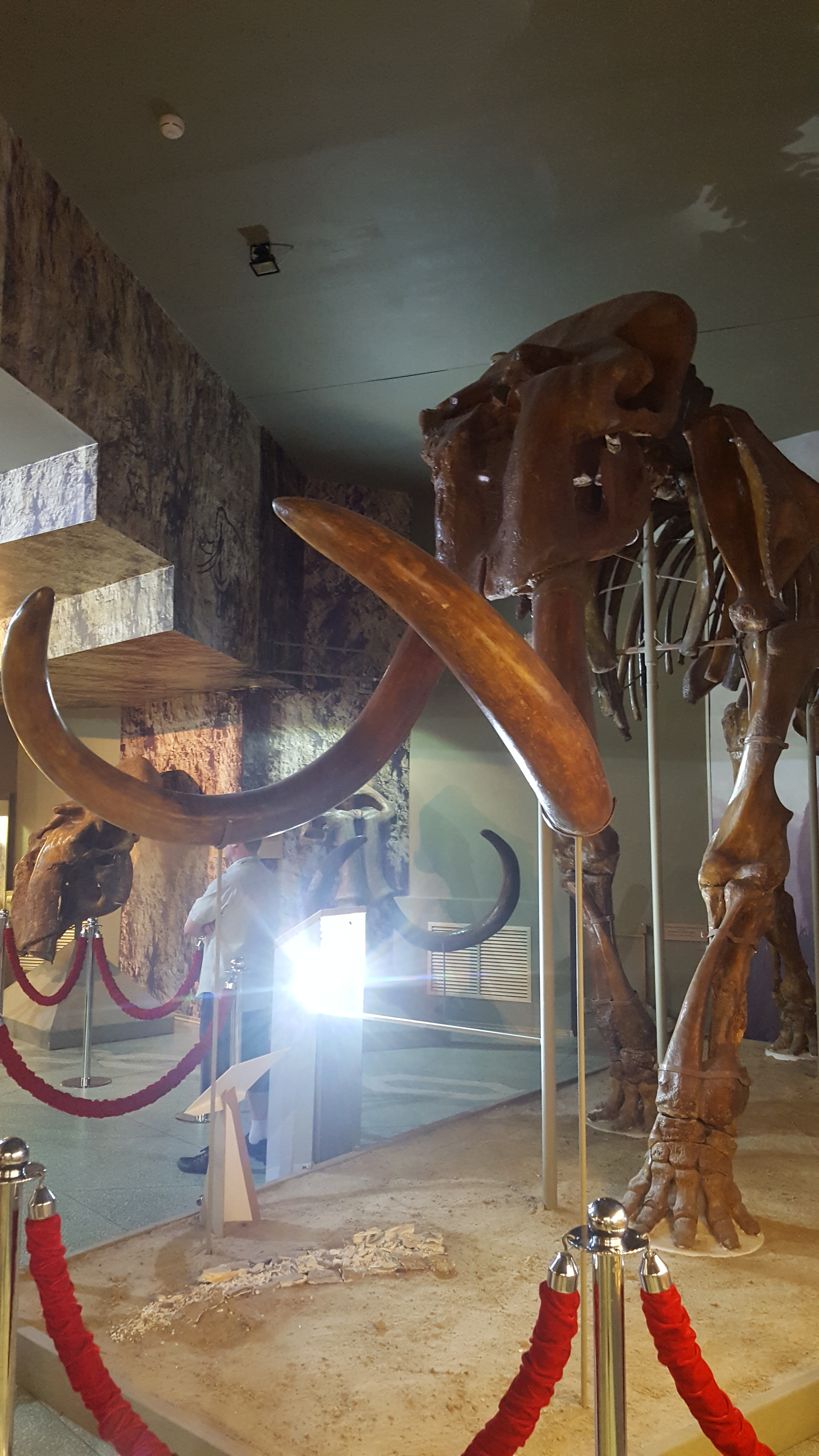
Steppe mammoth

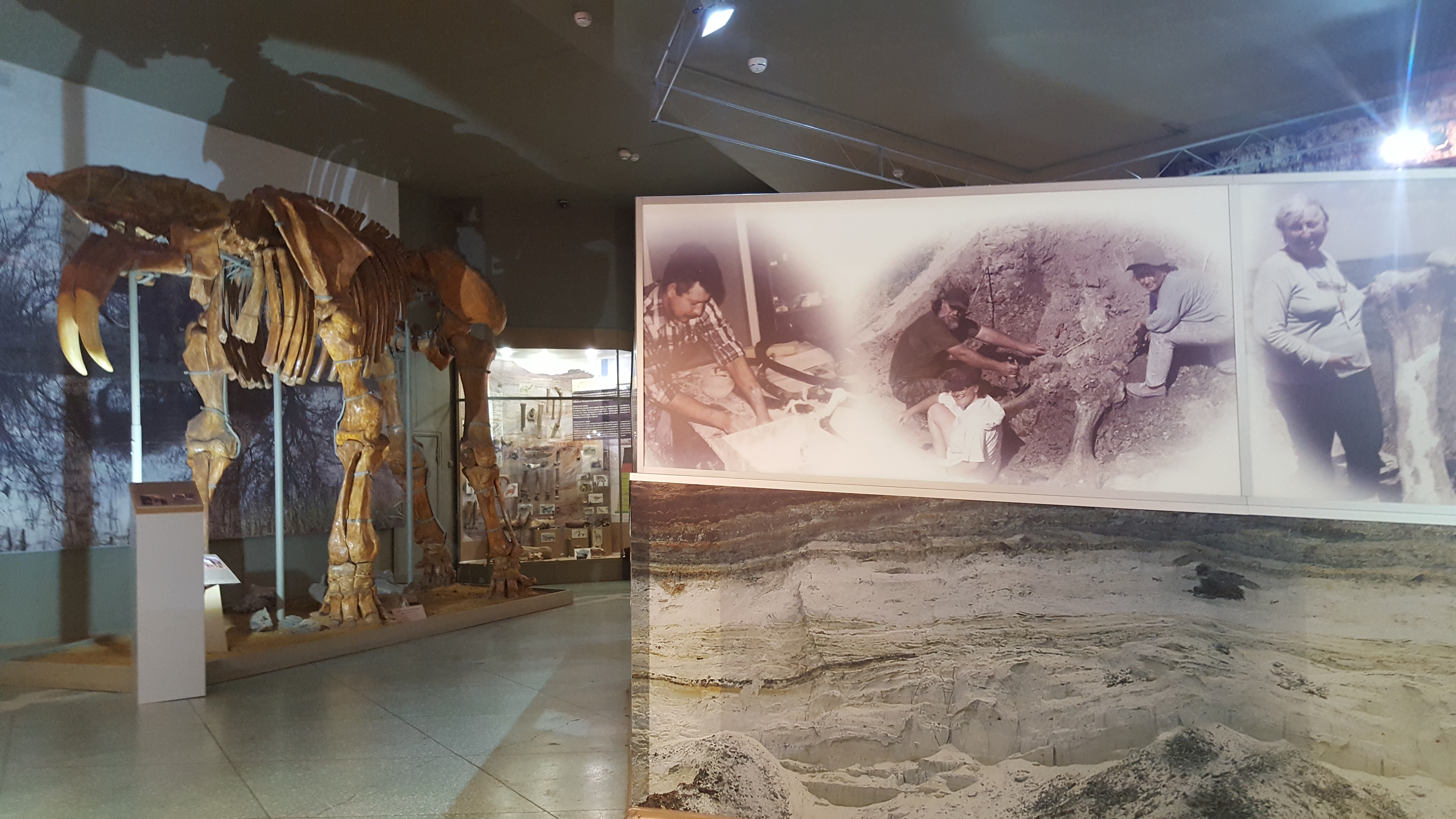
Deinotherium

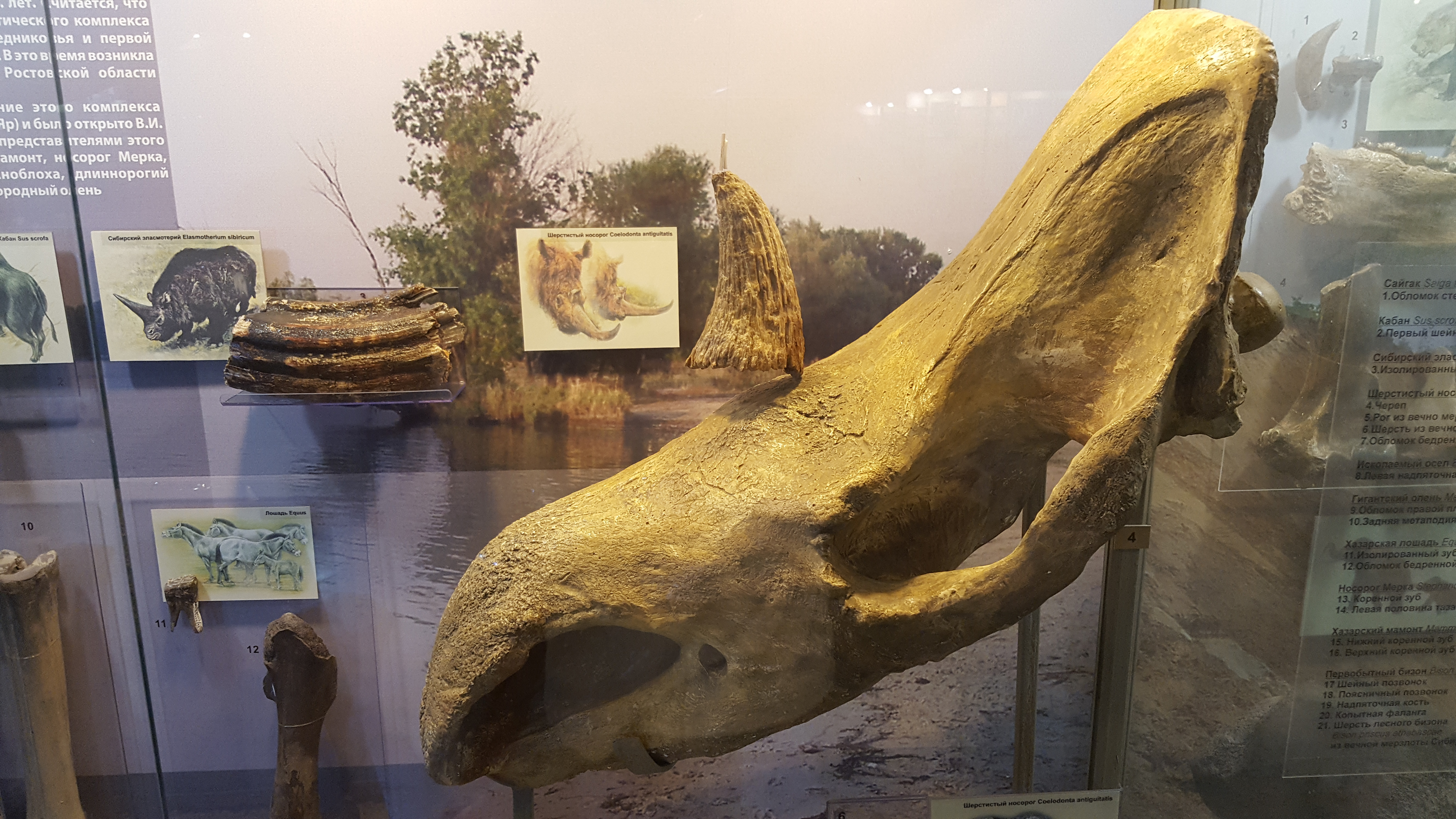
Woolly rhinoceros

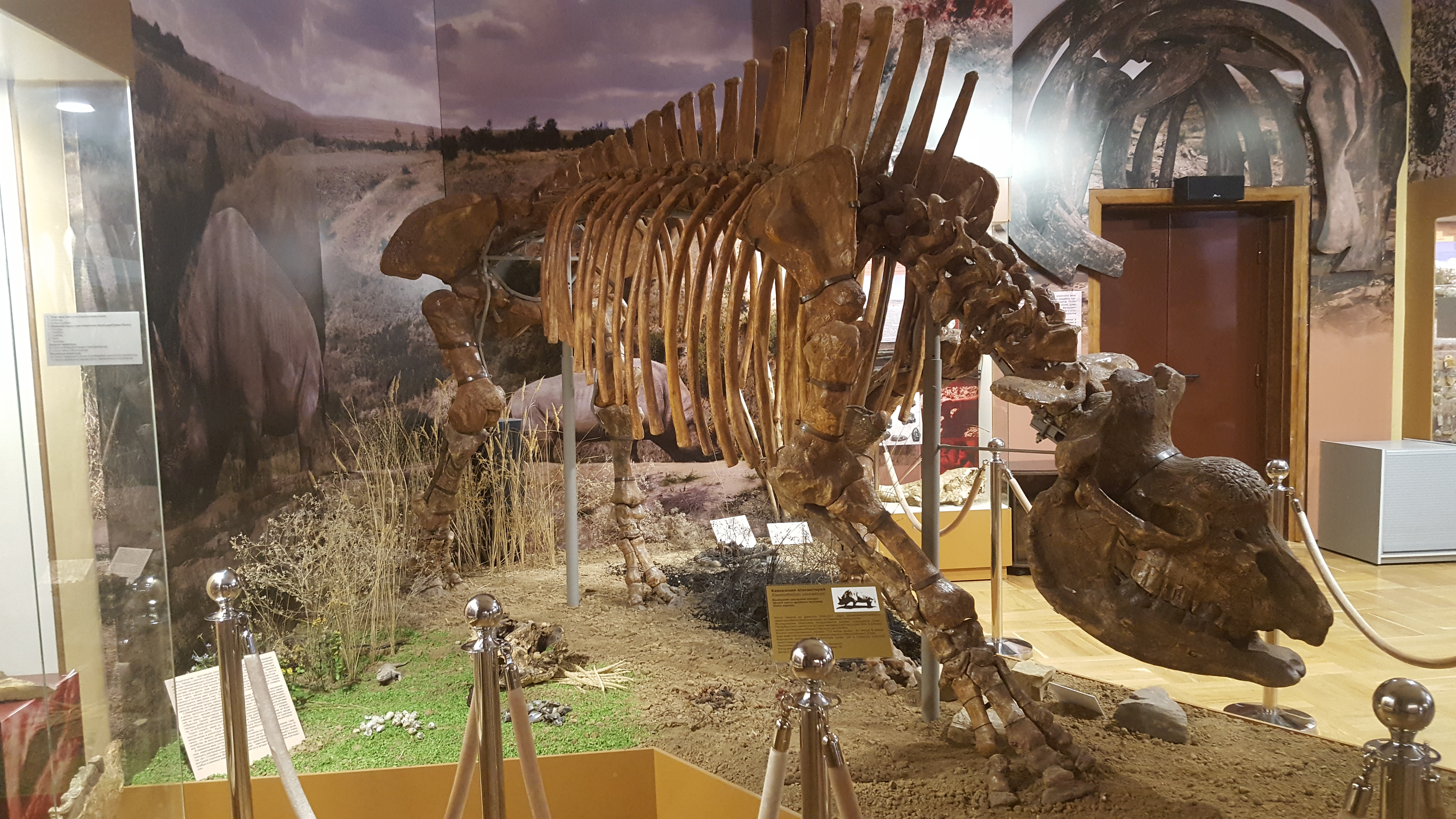
Elasmotherium

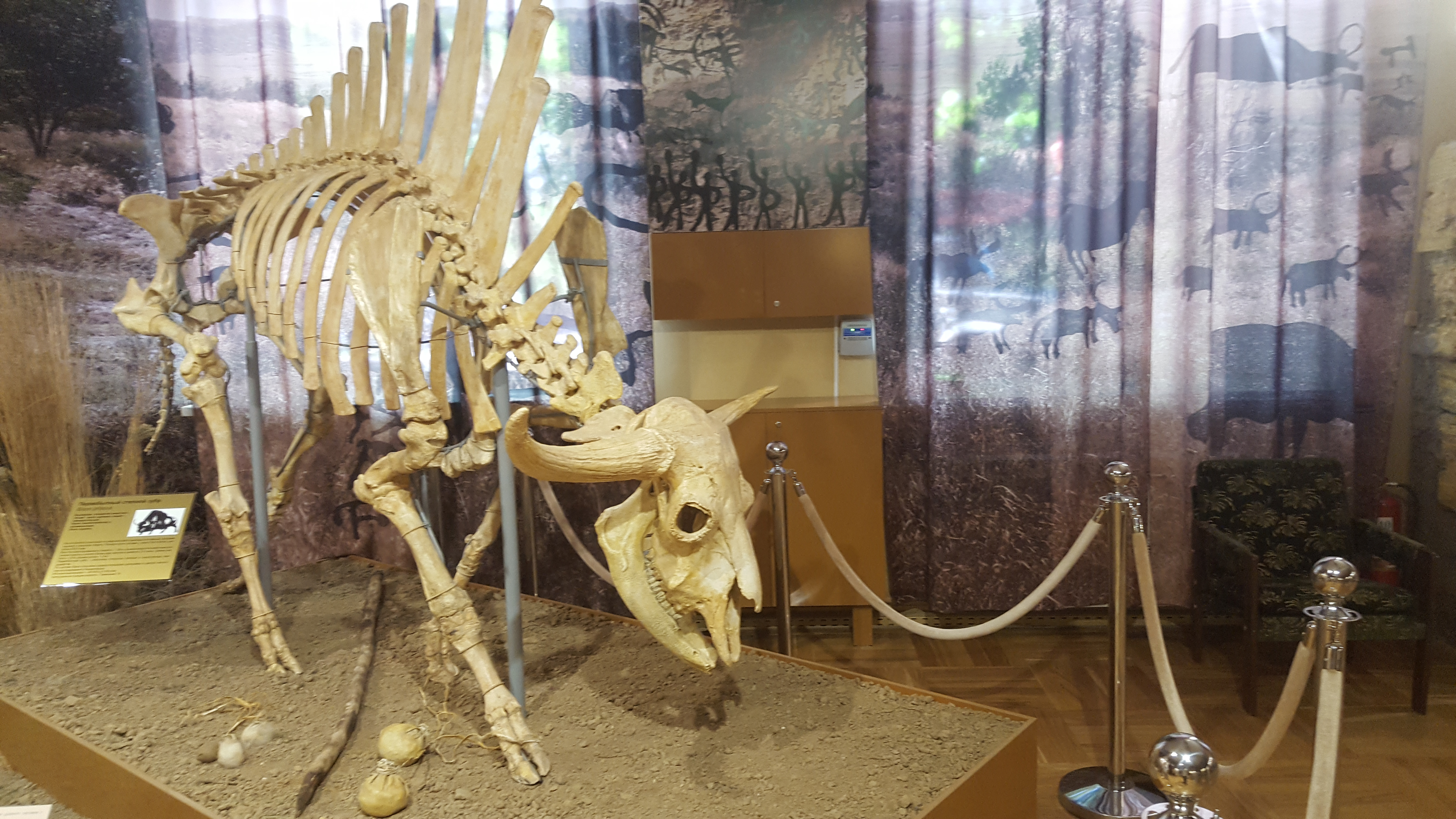
Steppe bison

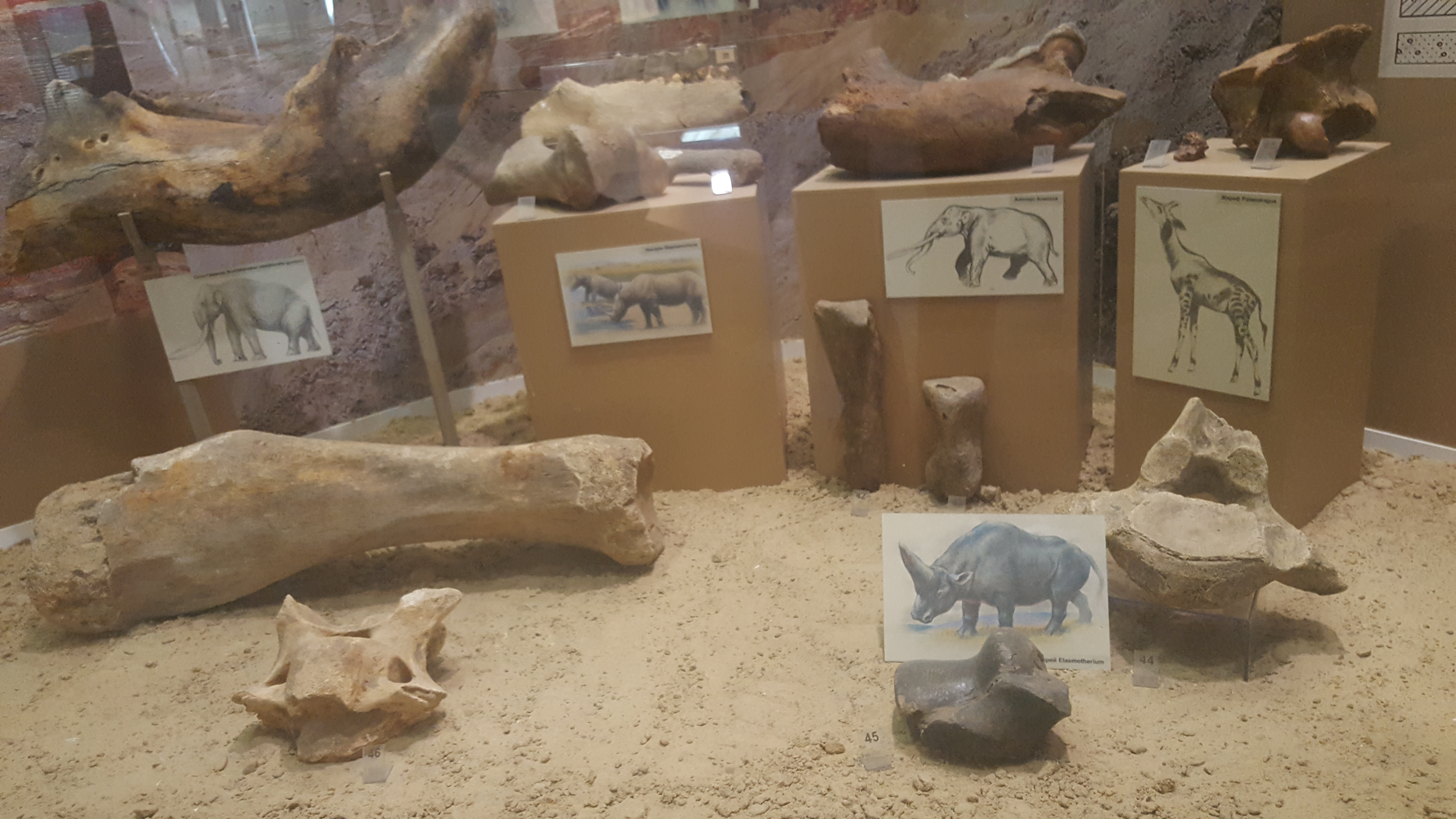
Bones (various species)

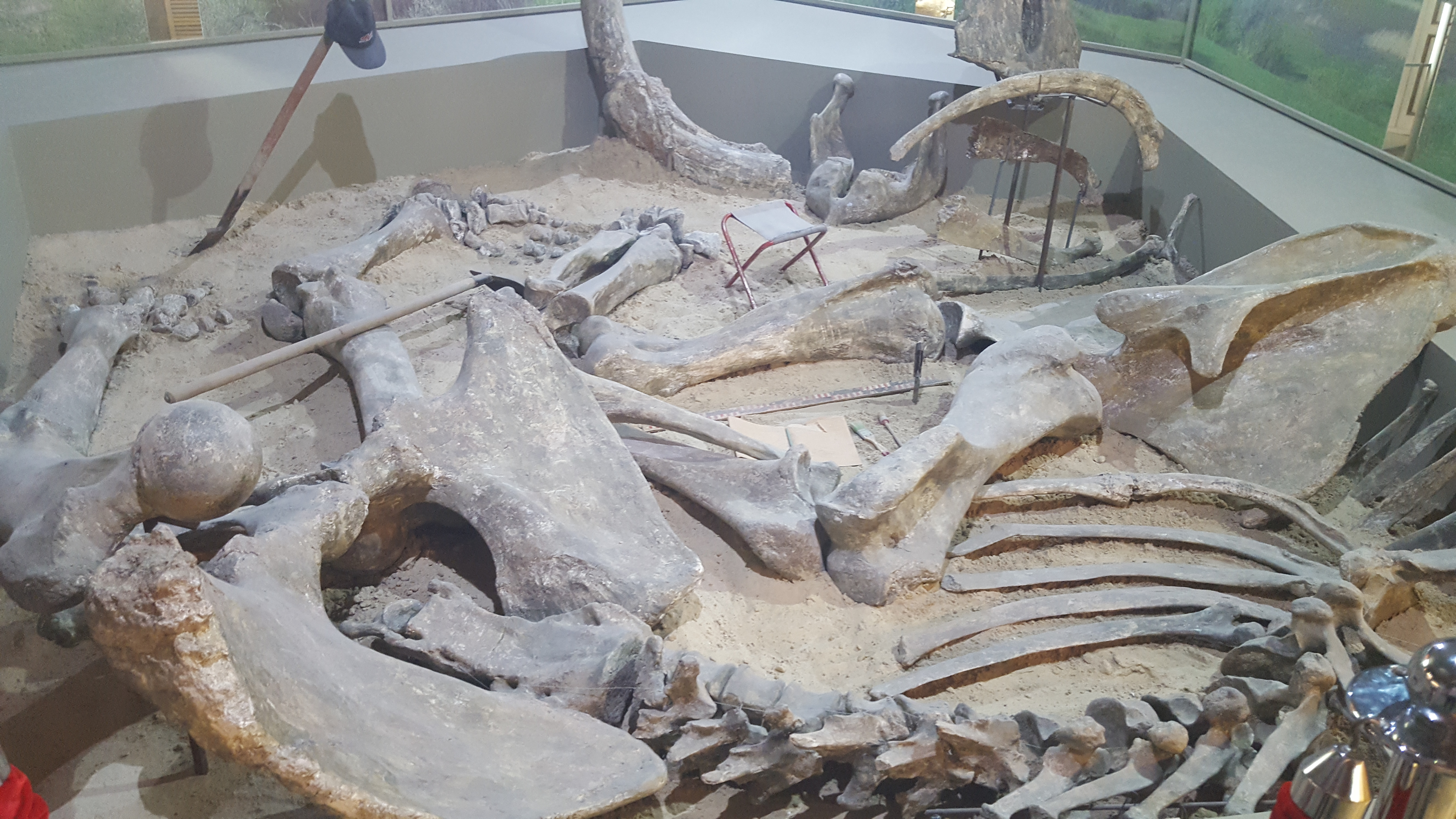
Reconstruction of steppe mammoth excavation site
Weaponry

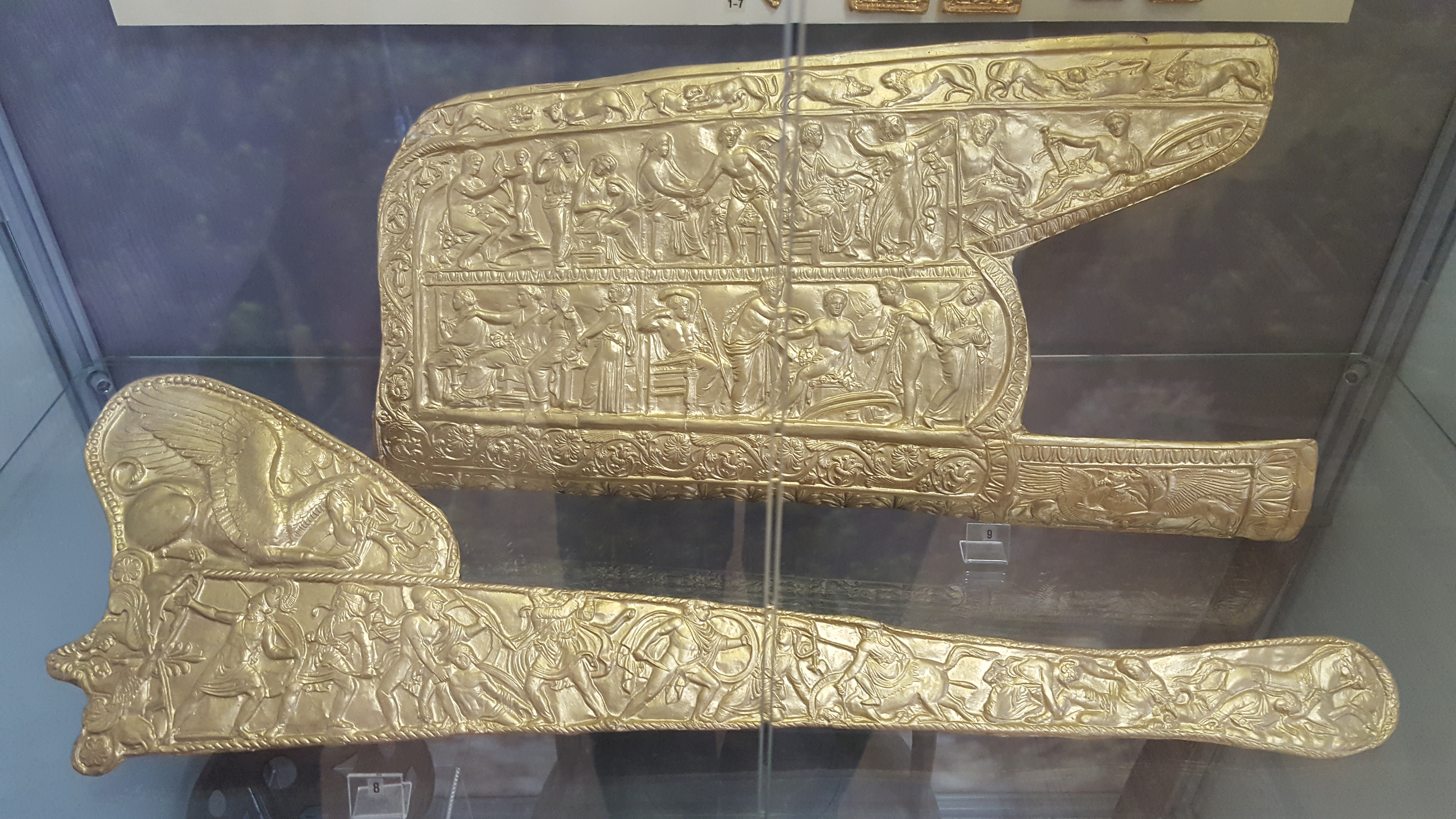
Gorytos and sword sheath

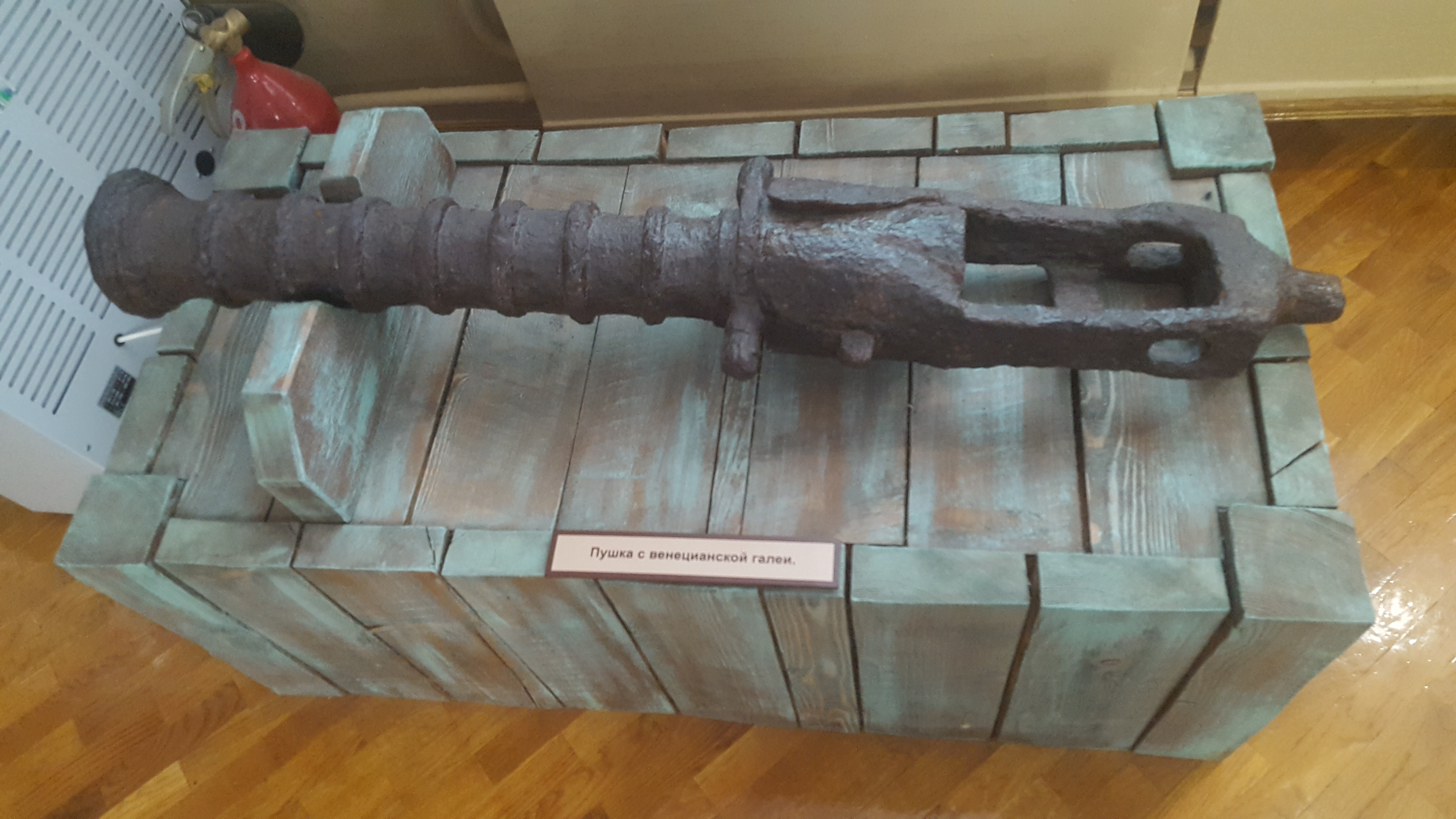
Venetian naval cannon

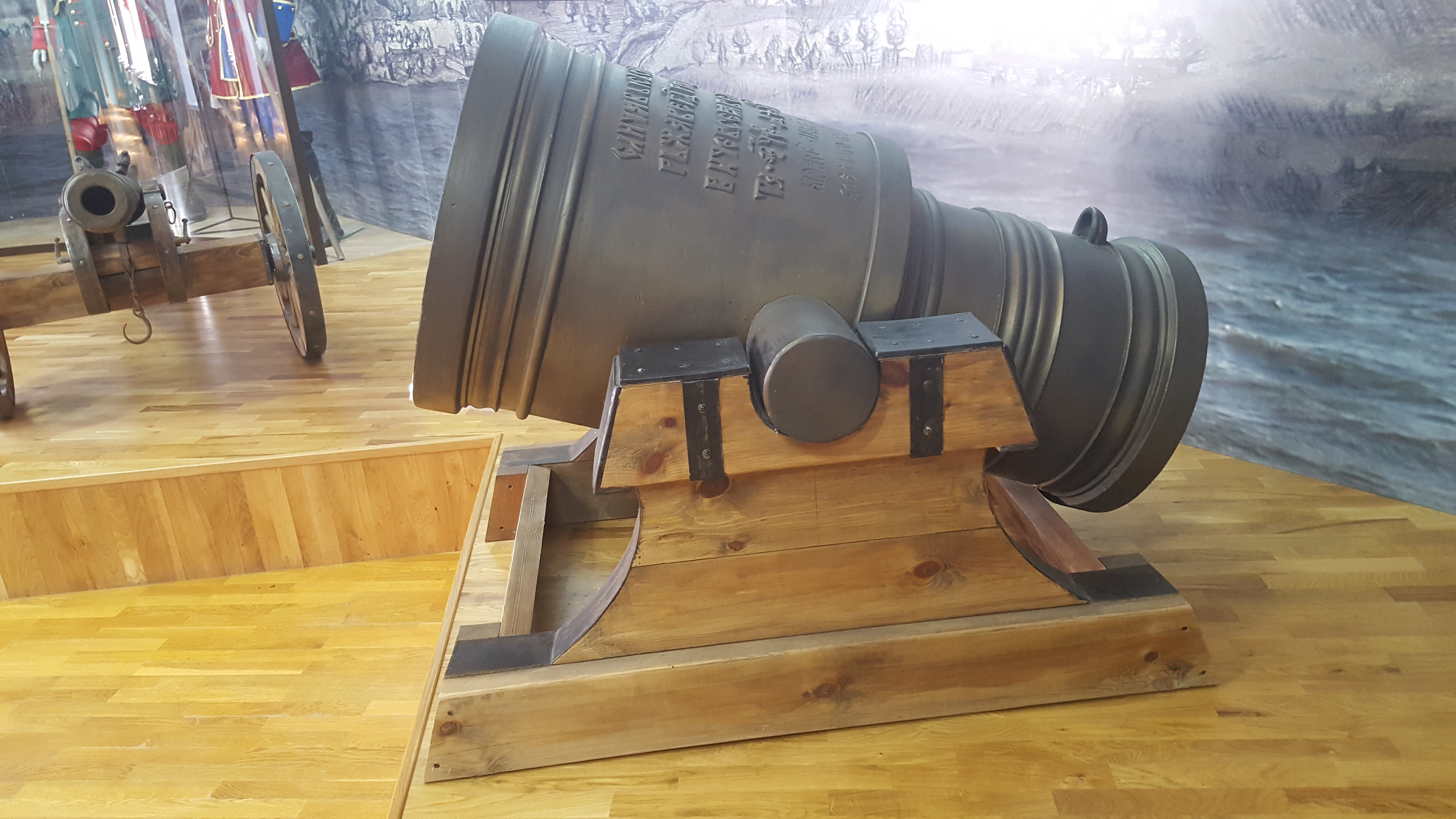
Mortar

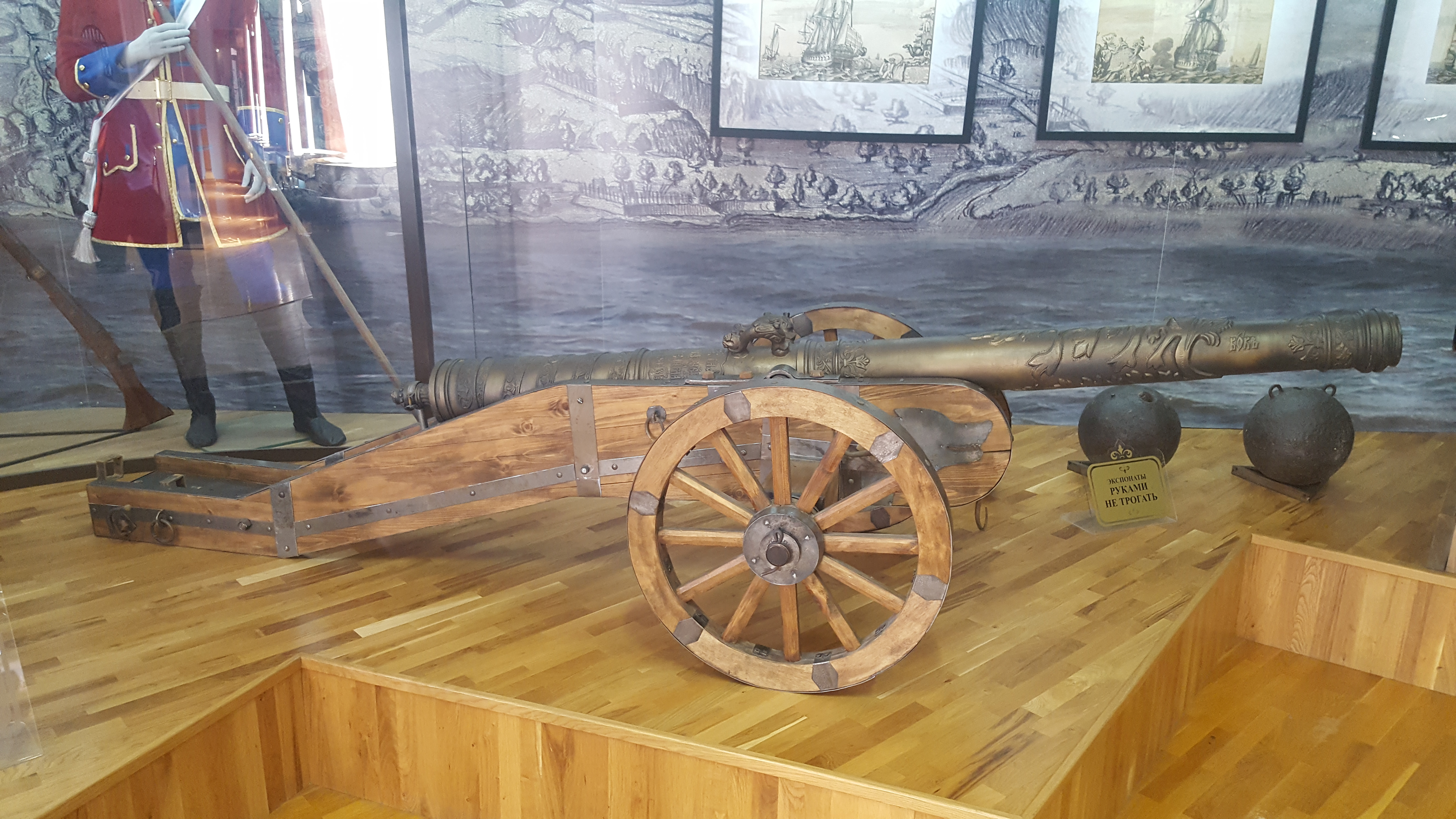
Cannon

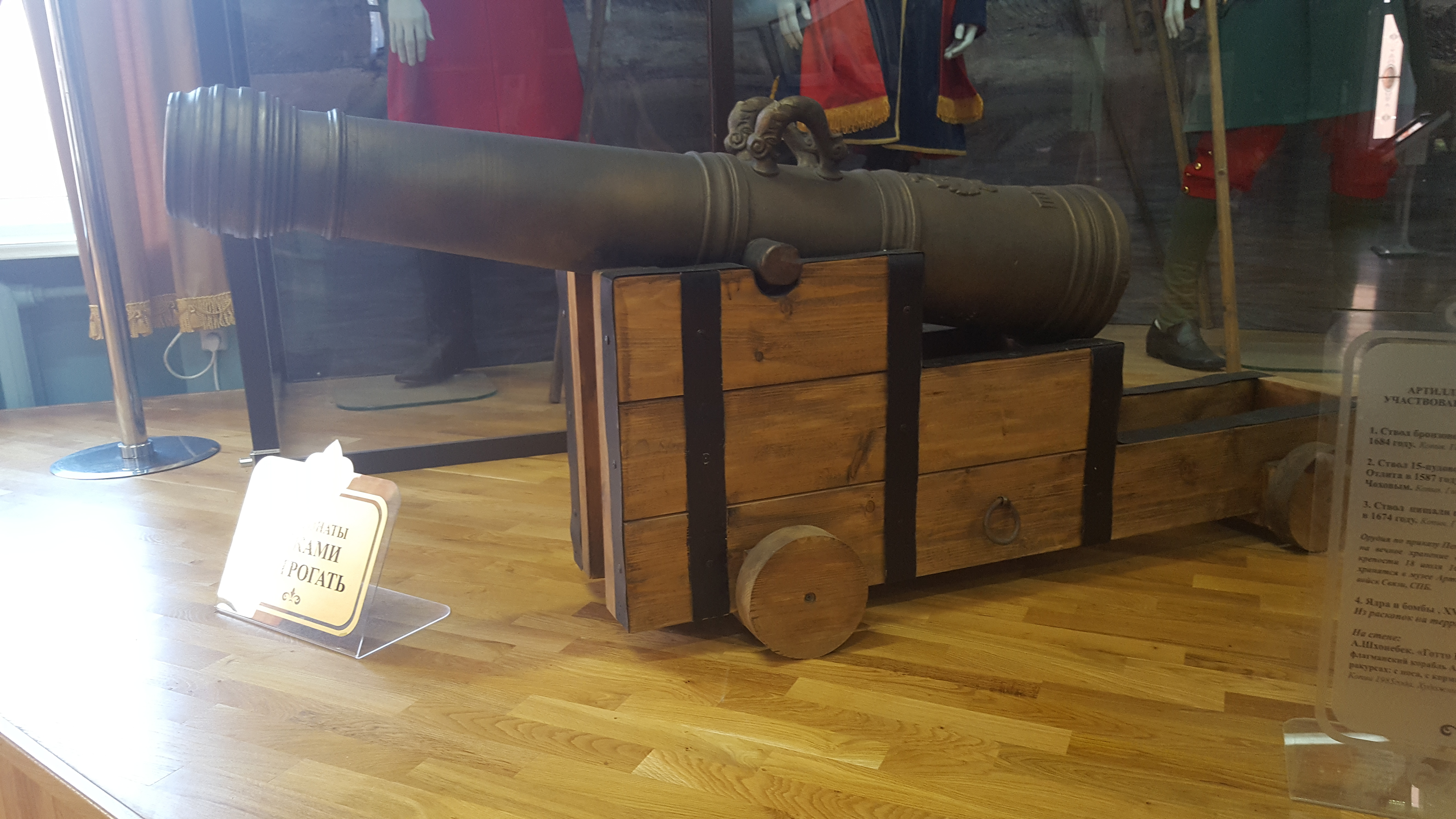
Cannon

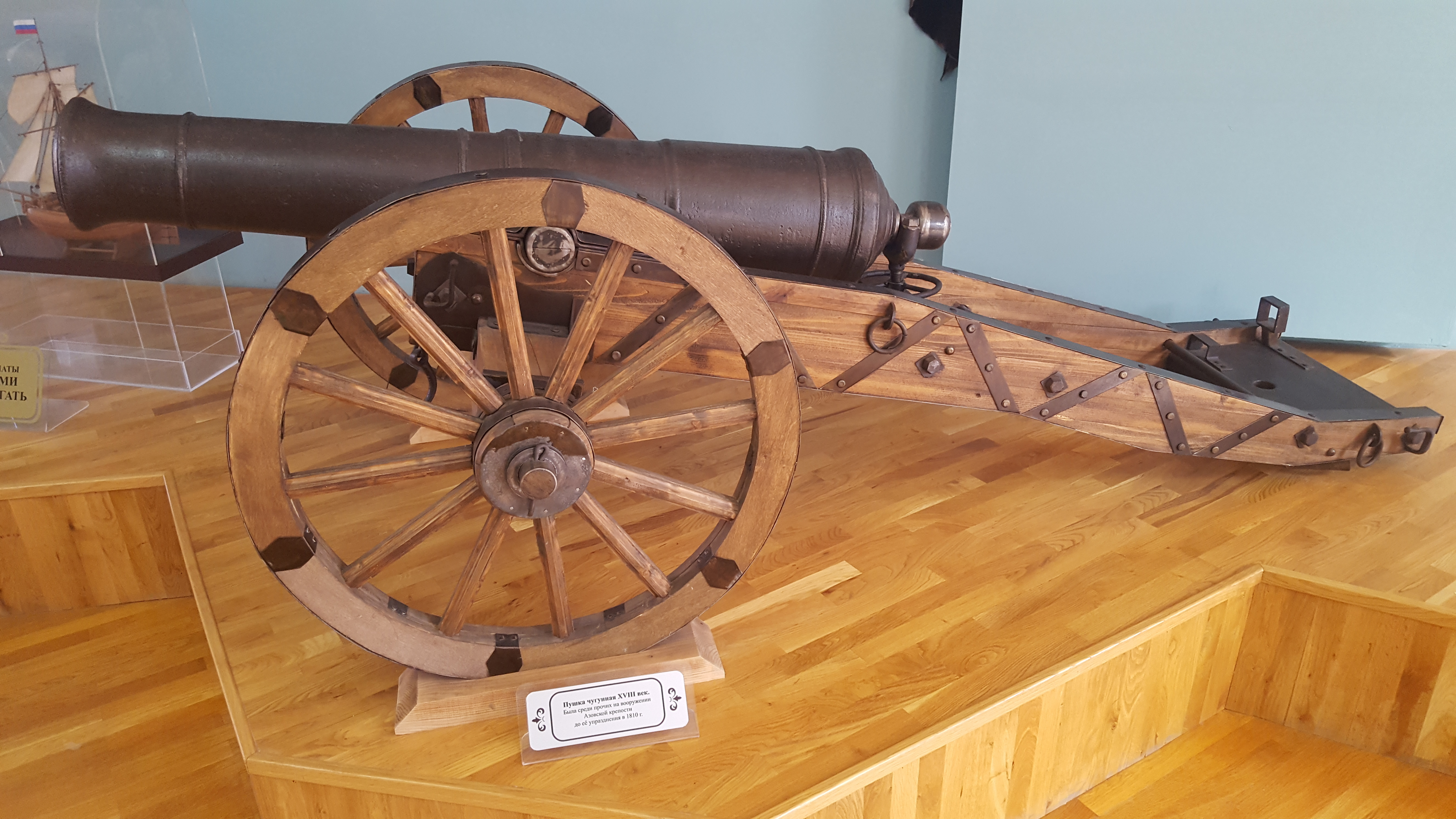
Cannon

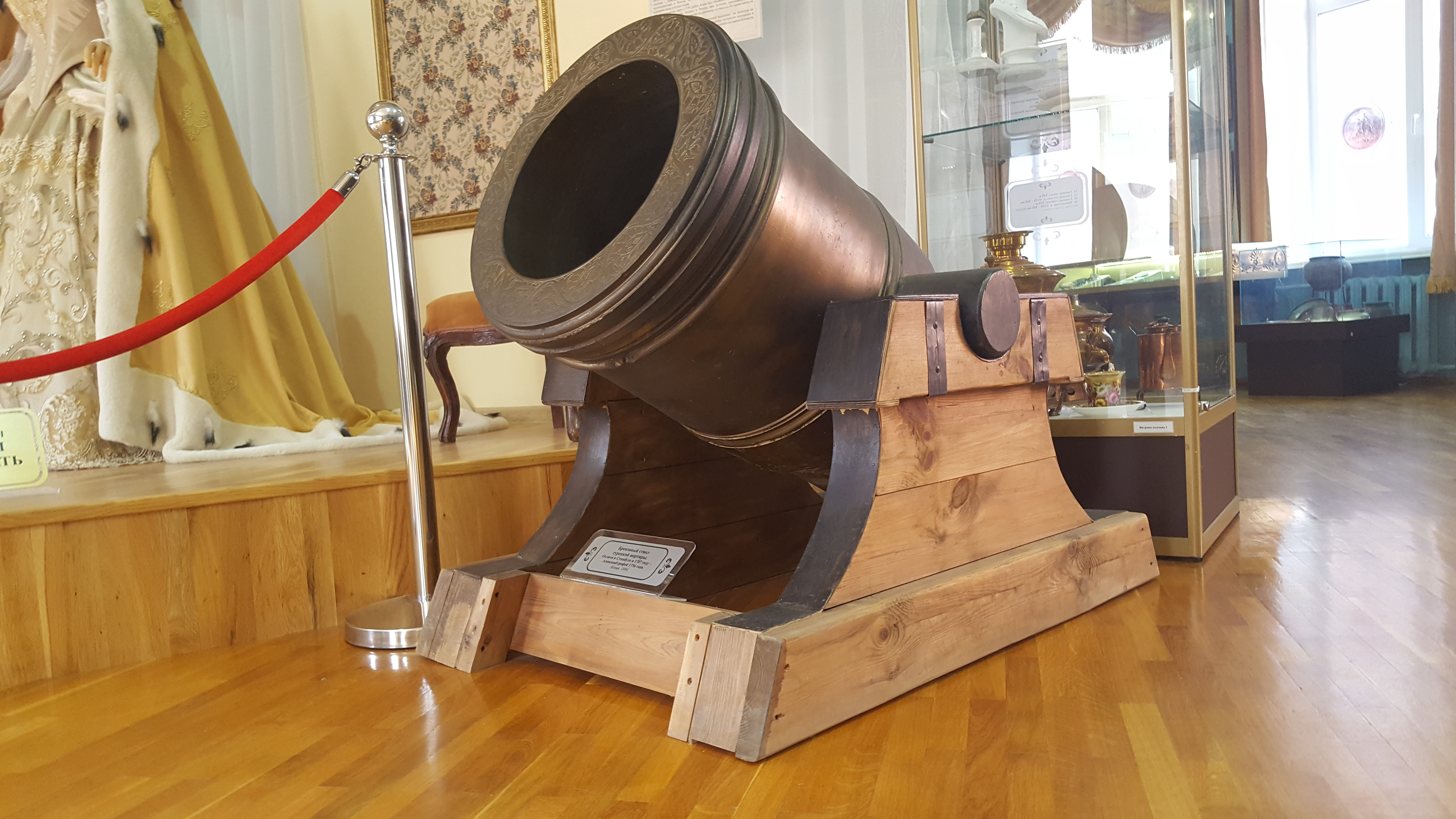
Turkish mortar

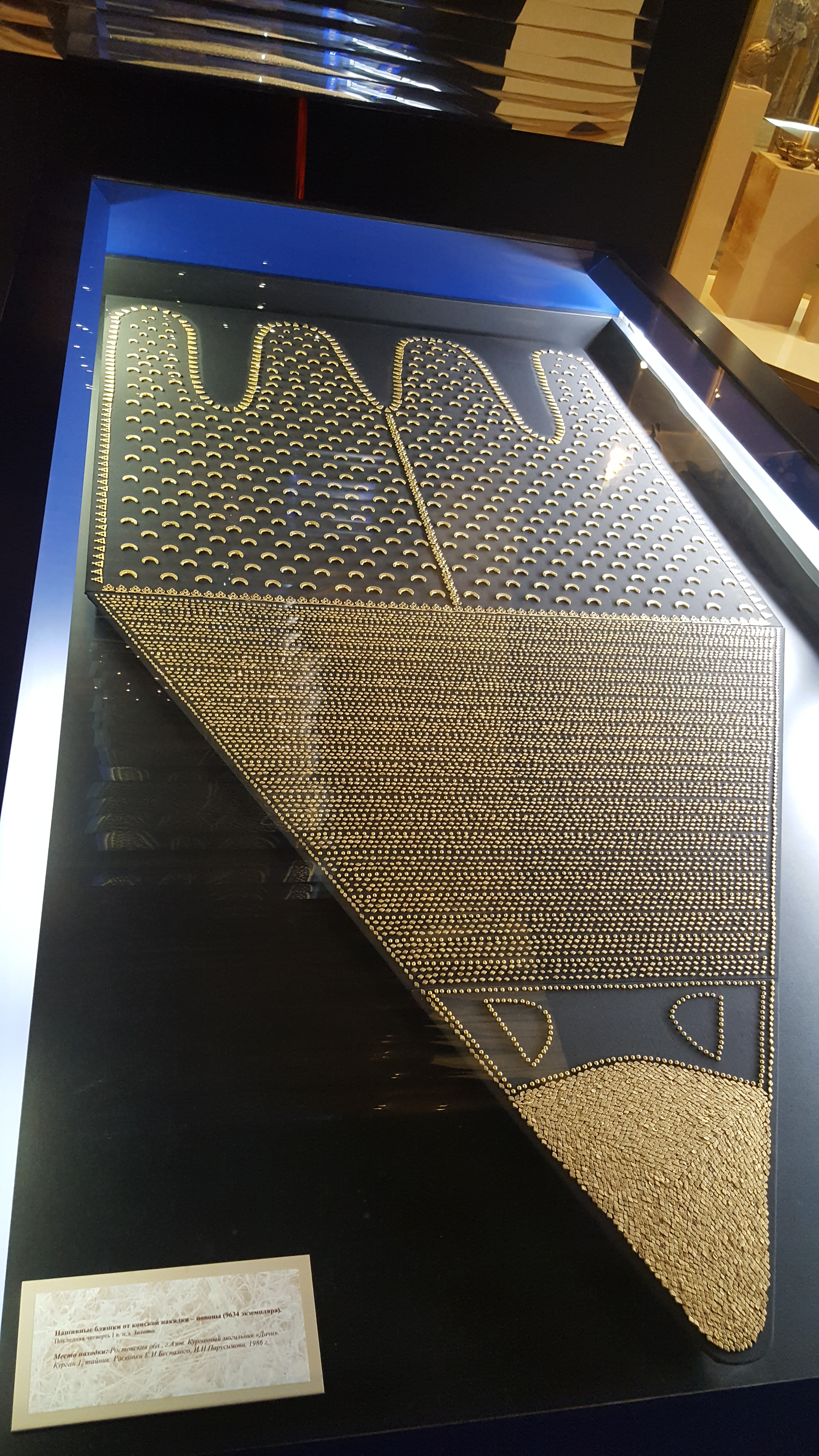
Gold plaques from caparisons
