= Azov =

Town in Rostov Oblast, Russia

Azov Азов
- Town
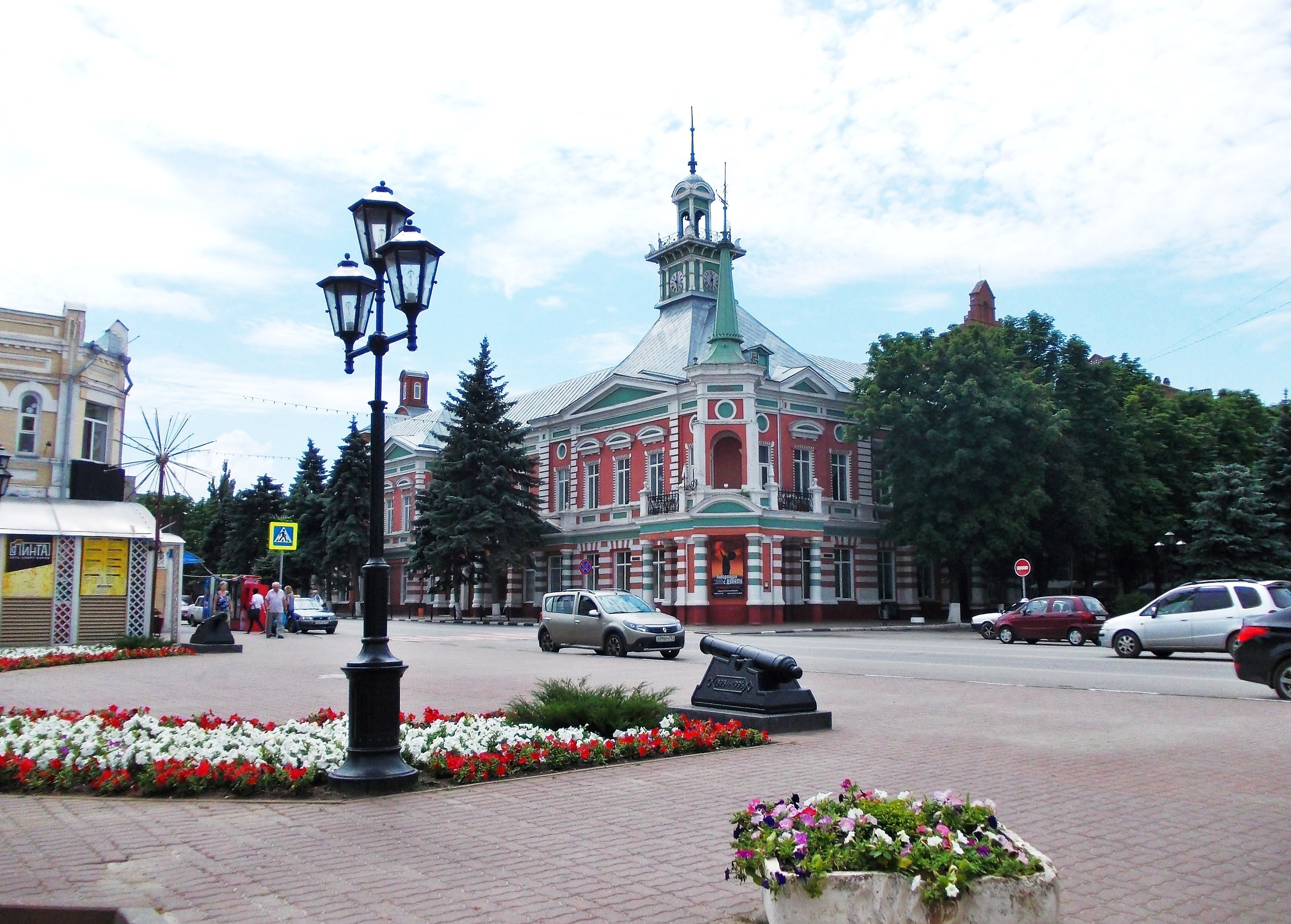

- Flag Coat of arms
- Interactive map of Azov
- Location of Azov Azov (Rostov Oblast)
- Coordinates: 47°06′30″N 39°25′05″E
- Country: Russia
- Federal subject: Rostov Oblast
- Founded: 13th century
- Town status since: 1708

Government
  - Leader: Sergey Bezdolny
- Elevation: 40 m (130 ft)

Population (2010 Census)
  - Total: 82,937
  - Estimate (2025): 79,872 (−3.7%)
  - Rank: 198th in 2010

Administrative status
  - Subordinated to: Azov Urban Okrug
  - Capital of: Azovsky District, Azov Urban Okrug

Municipal status
  - Urban okrug: Azov Urban Okrug
  - Capital of: Azov Urban Okrug, Azovsky Municipal District
- Time zone: UTC+3 (MSK)
- Postal code: 346780
- Dialing code: +7 86342
- OKTMO ID: 60704000001

Azov (Russian: Азов, IPA: [ɐˈzof]), previously known as Azak (Turki/Kypchak: ازاق), is a town in Rostov Oblast, Russia, situated on the Don River just 16 kilometers (9.9 mi) from the Sea of Azov, which derives its name from the town. The population is 81,924 in the 2021 census, 82,937 in the 2010 census, 82,090 in the 2002 census, and 80,297 in the 1989 Soviet census.

== History ==
=== Early settlements in the vicinity ===
The mouth of the Don River has always been an important commercial center. At the start of the 3rd century BCE, the Greeks from the Bosporan Kingdom founded a colony here, which they called Tanais (after the Greek name of the river). Several centuries later, in the last third of 1st century BCE, the settlement was burned down by king Polemon I of Pontus. The introduction of Greek colonists restored its prosperity, but the Goths practically annihilated it in the 3rd century. The site of ancient Tanais, now occupied by the khutor of Nedvigovka, has been excavated since the mid-19th century.

In the 5th century, the area was populated by Karadach and his Akatziroi. They were ruled by Dengizich the Hun. Byzantium gave the land to the Hunugurs in the 460s; it became known as Patria Onoguria under his brother, Ernakh. Its Hun inhabitants became known as the Utigur Bulgars when it became part of the Western Turkic Kaghanate under Sandilch. Then in the 7th century Khan Kubrat, ruler of the Unogundurs established Old Great Bolgary there before his heir Batbayan surrendered it to the Khazars.

In the 10th century, as the Khazar state disintegrated, the area came under the control of the Slavic princedom of Tmutarakan. The Kipchaks, seizing the area in 1067, renamed it Azaq (i.e., lowlands), from which appellation the modern name is derived. The Golden Horde claimed most of the coast in the 13th and 14th centuries, but the Venetian and Genoese merchants were granted permission to settle on the site of modern-day Azov and founded there a colony which they called Tana.

=== Archaeological digs ===
In autumn 2000, Thor Heyerdahl wanted to further investigate his idea that Scandinavians may have migrated from the south via waterways. He sought the origin of Odin (Wotan), the Germanic and Nordic god of the mythologies of the early Norse Eddas and Sagas. According to Snorri Sturluson, the Icelandic author of an Edda and at least one Saga, who wrote in the 13th century, Odin was supposed to have migrated from the region of the Caucasus or the area just east of the Black Sea near the turn of the 1st century CE. Heyerdahl was particularly interested in Snorri's reference to the land of origin of the Æsir people. Heyerdahl wanted to test the veracity of Snorri's claims and as a result, organized the Joint Archaeological Excavation in Azov in 2001. He had wanted to undertake a second excavation the following year, but it never happened due to his death in April 2002.

== Fortress ==
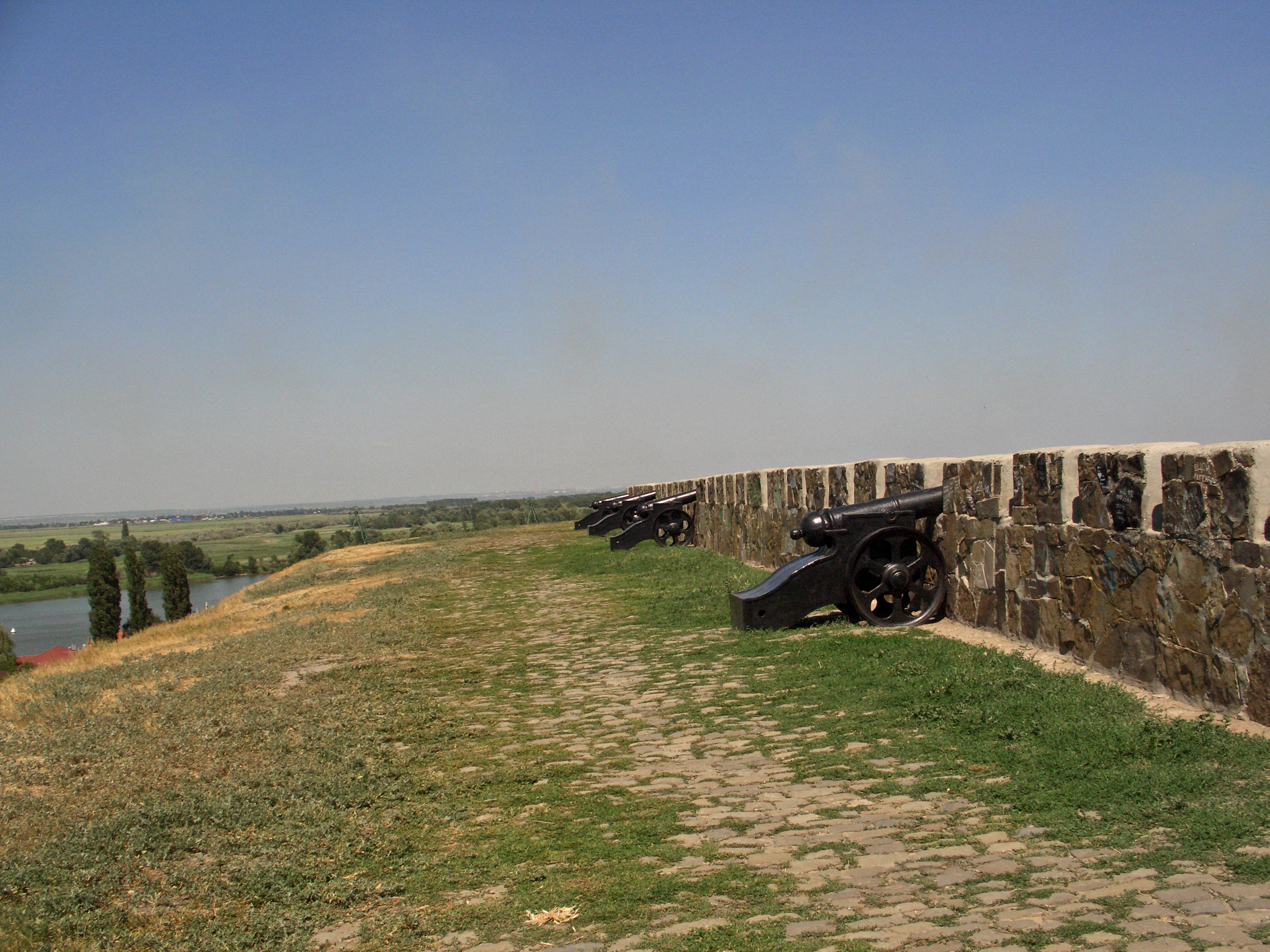
Ramparts of Azov Fortress

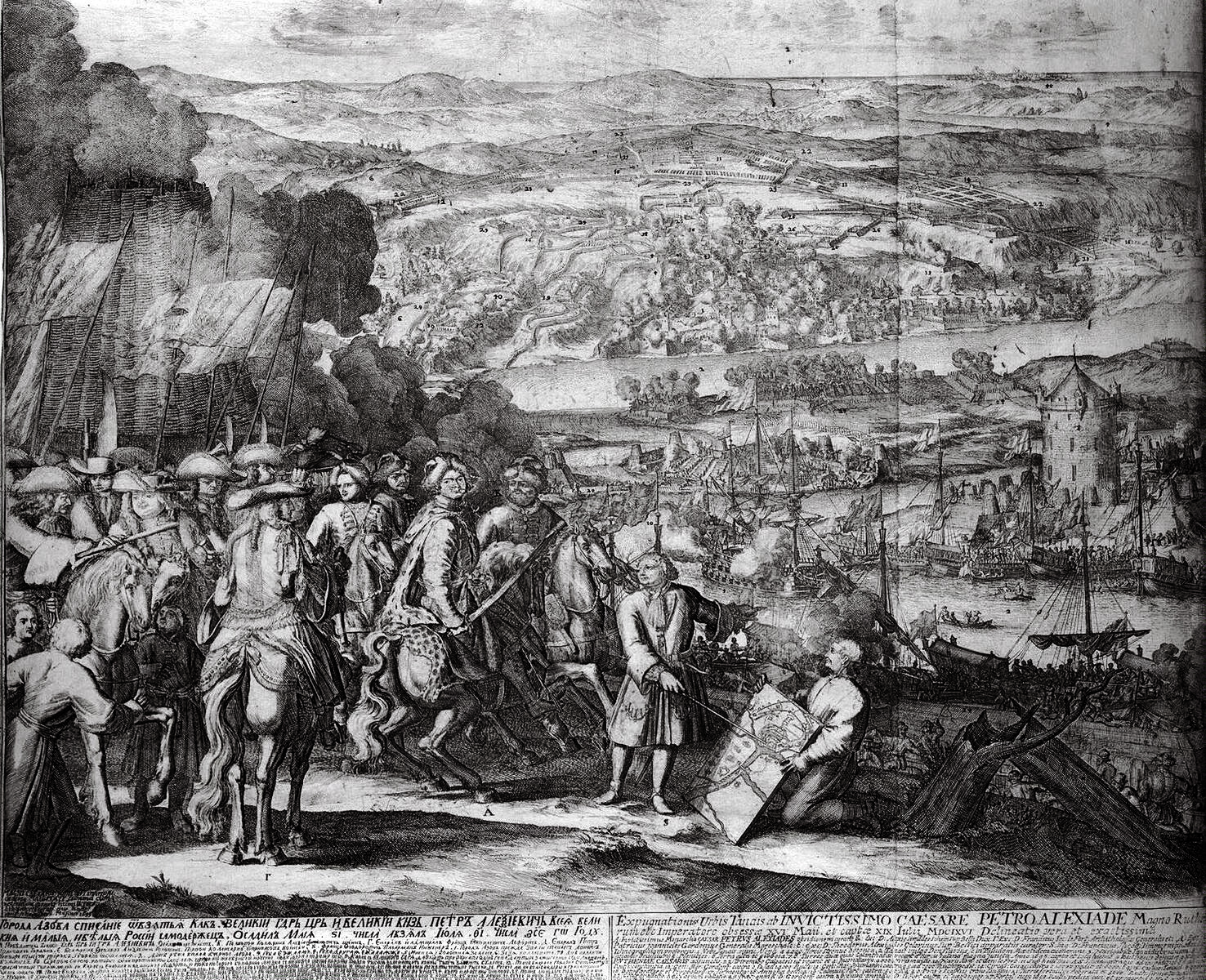
A 17th-century Dutch engraving representing the Battle of Azov (1696)

In 1471, the Ottoman Empire gained control of the area and built the strong fortress of Azak (Azov). The fort blocked the Don Cossacks from raiding and trading in the Black Sea. The Cossacks attacked Azov in 1574, 1593, 1620, and 1626. In April 1637, three thousand Don Cossacks and four thousand Zaporozhian Cossacks besieged Azov. The Turks had four thousand soldiers and two hundred cannons. The fort fell on 21 June and the Cossacks sent a request to the Tsar for re-enforcements and support. A commission recommended against this because of the danger of war with Turkey and the poor state of the fortifications. In June 1641, Hussein Deli, Pasha of Silistria, invested the fort with 70,000–80,000 men. In September, they had to withdraw because of disease and provisioning shortfalls. A second Russian commission reported that the siege had left very little of the walls. In March 1642, Sultan Ibrahim issued an ultimatum and Tsar Mikhail ordered the Cossacks to evacuate. The Turks reoccupied Azov in September 1642.

In 1693, the garrison of the fortress was 3,656 of whom 2,272 were Janissaries.

The fortress, however, had yet to pass through many vicissitudes. During the Azov campaigns of 1696, Peter the Great, who desired naval access to the Black Sea, managed to recover the fortress. Azov was granted town status in 1708, but the disastrous Pruth River Campaign constrained him to hand it back to the Turks in 1711. A humorous description of the events is featured in Voltaire's Candide. During the Great Russo-Turkish War, it was taken by the army under Count Rumyantsev and finally ceded to Russia under the terms of Treaty of Kuchuk-Kainarji (1774). For seven years Azov was a seat of its own governorate, but with the growth of neighboring Rostov-on-the-Don it gradually declined in importance. The Germans and Austrians occupied Azov in 1917–1918, during World War I. It was occupied by the Germans between July 1942 and February 1943 during World War II.

== Administrative and municipal status ==
Within the framework of administrative divisions, Azov serves as the administrative center of Azovsky District, even though it is not a part of it. As an administrative division, it is incorporated separately as Azov Urban Okrug—an administrative unit with the status equal to that of the districts. As a municipal division, this administrative unit also has urban okrug status.

== Government ==
Sergey Bezdolny of the United Russia party was elected Mayor of Azov on 3 April 2005 and re-elected on 11 October 2009 by 72.9% of the voters. The current head of administration (city-manager) Vladimir Rashchupkin holds office from December 2015.

== Geography ==
=== Climate ===
Azov's climate is humid continental (Köppen climate classification Dfa), featuring hot summers, cold winters (though quite mild for Russia), and fairly low precipitation.

Climate data for Azov
Month	Jan	Feb	Mar	Apr	May	Jun	Jul	Aug	Sep	Oct	Nov	Dec	Year
Mean daily maximum °C (°F)	−0.9 (30.4)	0.3 (32.5)	6.2 (43.2)	16.3 (61.3)	22.8 (73.0)	26.5 (79.7)	28.7 (83.7)	27.9 (82.2)	22.5 (72.5)	14.6 (58.3)	7.5 (45.5)	2.5 (36.5)	14.6 (58.2)
Mean daily minimum °C (°F)	−7.2 (19.0)	−6.4 (20.5)	−1.3 (29.7)	6.4 (43.5)	12.3 (54.1)	16.3 (61.3)	18.1 (64.6)	16.8 (62.2)	11.9 (53.4)	5.8 (42.4)	1.4 (34.5)	−2.9 (26.8)	5.9 (42.7)
Average precipitation mm (inches)	47 (1.9)	37 (1.5)	31 (1.2)	43 (1.7)	53 (2.1)	67 (2.6)	51 (2.0)	37 (1.5)	36 (1.4)	30 (1.2)	46 (1.8)	61 (2.4)	539 (21.3)
Average precipitation days	9	7	6	7	7	7	6	5	5	5	8	10	82
Source: World Meteorological Organisation (UN)

== Attractions ==
There are many monuments and museums in Azov.

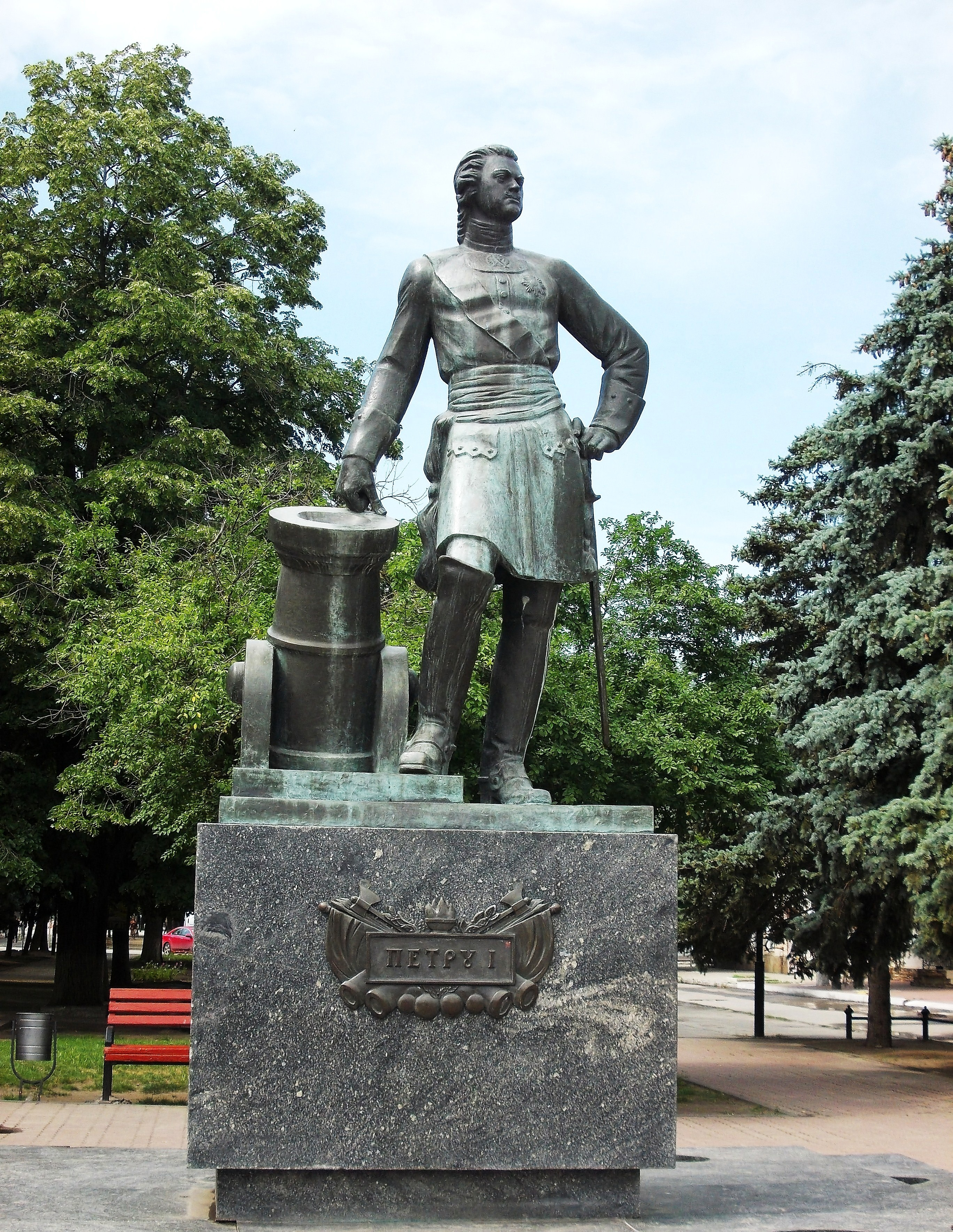
Azov. Monument to Peter I. 1996

Built in 1799, the Powder Cellar Museum in Azov is the only remaining fortress of Catherine's time in all of what was once southern Russia. Fortresses she built in Rostov, Taganrog and elsewhere have been completely destroyed, so Azov's deserves to be considered an architectural monument to the art of military engineering in the 18th century. A wooden cellar served a quarter century, but in 1797 had become dilapidated, so it was dismantled, and replaced with a cellar made of stone. In 1799, in the bastion of St. Anne, a new powder cellar was built. From the beginning of the 19th to the 20th century the cellar was used to store of ice. From 1961 to 1965 the cellar was renovated and handed over to the Azov Museum of History, Archaeology and Palaeontology.

In 1967, to celebrate the 900-year anniversary of Azov, Soviet officials opened the exposition diorama "The taking of Azov by the troops of Peter the Great in 1696." The author of the diorama was the Russian artist Arseniy Chernyshov.

The Azov Fortress is a fortified complex overlooking the Don River and the Port of Azov to the north. It includes a rampart, watchtowers and gates.

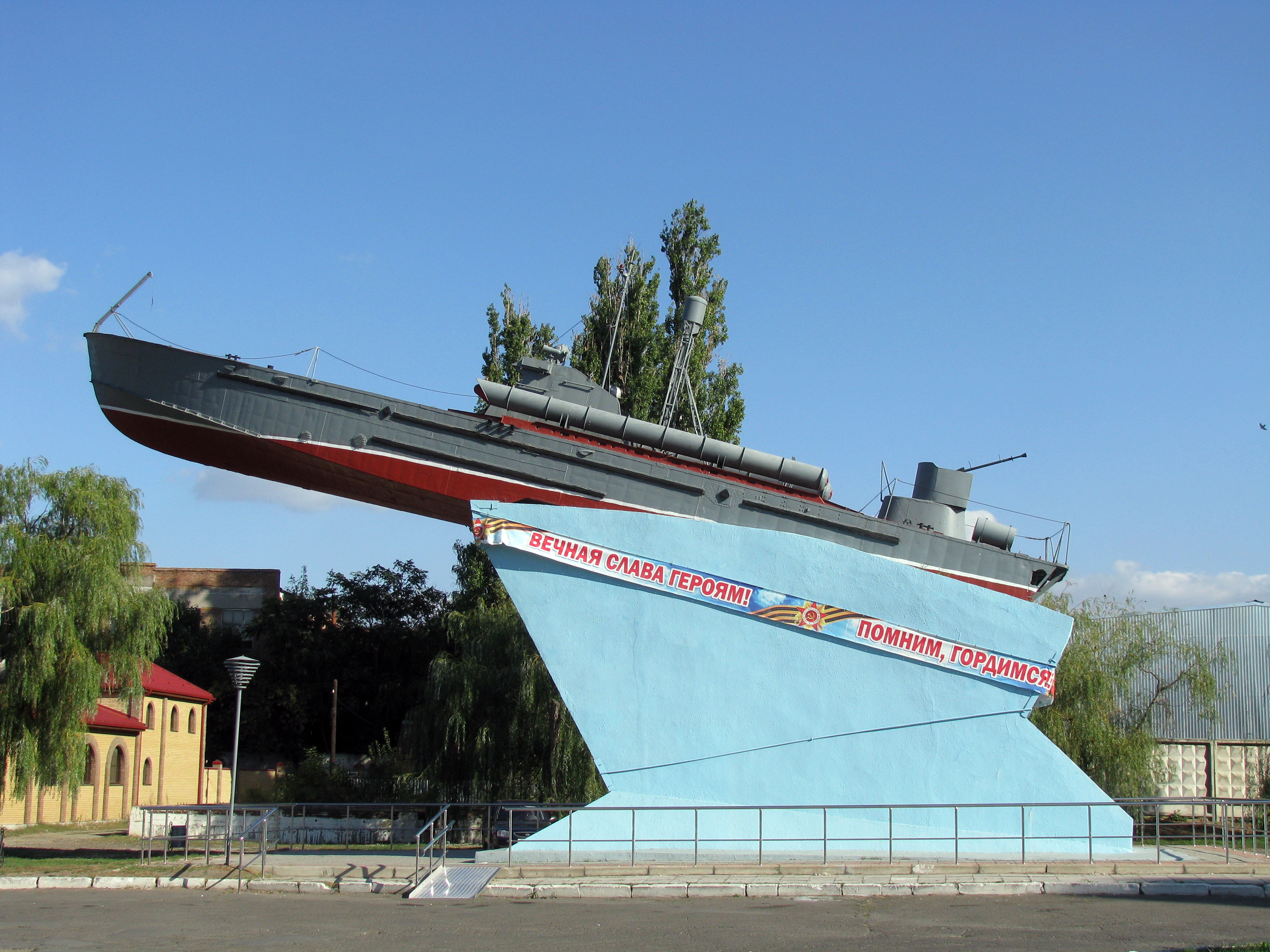
Azov. Monument to the sailors of the Azov Flotilla. 1975

Monument to Peter I is a bronze monument of Peter the Great in the center of Azov. It was designed by sculptors Oleg Komov and Andrey Kovalchuk. The opening ceremony took place on 19 July 1996 and was held in conjunction by the 300-year anniversary of the Russian Navy.

Monument to Aleksei Shein is a sculpture of Russian statesman, general, Boyar (from 1695), and the first Russian Generalissimo (1696) Aleksei Semenovich Shein. The monument was opened on 12 June 2009. The authors of the project were M. Lushnikov and V.P. Mokrousov.

Monument to the sailors of the Azov Flotilla is dedicated to the Flotilla, which heroically fought in Taganrog Bay and the Don Delta during the Great Patriotic War. The monument is considered to be an object of local cultural heritage.

The Azov Museum of History, Archaeology and Palaeontology is one of the biggest southern museums of Russia hosting the richest palaeontological collection in the south of Russia. The museum was established on 17 May 1917 by Michail Aronovich Makarovskiy. There is the House of Kovalev opposite the museum.

== Twin towns – sister cities ==
Azov is twinned with:

- Aglandjia, Cyprus (1990)
- Chillicothe, United States (1991)
- Feodosia, (Note: Disputed territory) Ukraine
- Pylos-Nestor, Greece (2017)
- Sečanj, Serbia (2018)
- Courbevoie, France (2018)
- Bijeljina, Bosnia and Herzegovina (2018)

== See also ==
- Azov campaigns (1695–96)
