= Russo-Turkish wars =

Series of conflicts between 1568 and 1918

- Part of the Ottoman wars in Europe
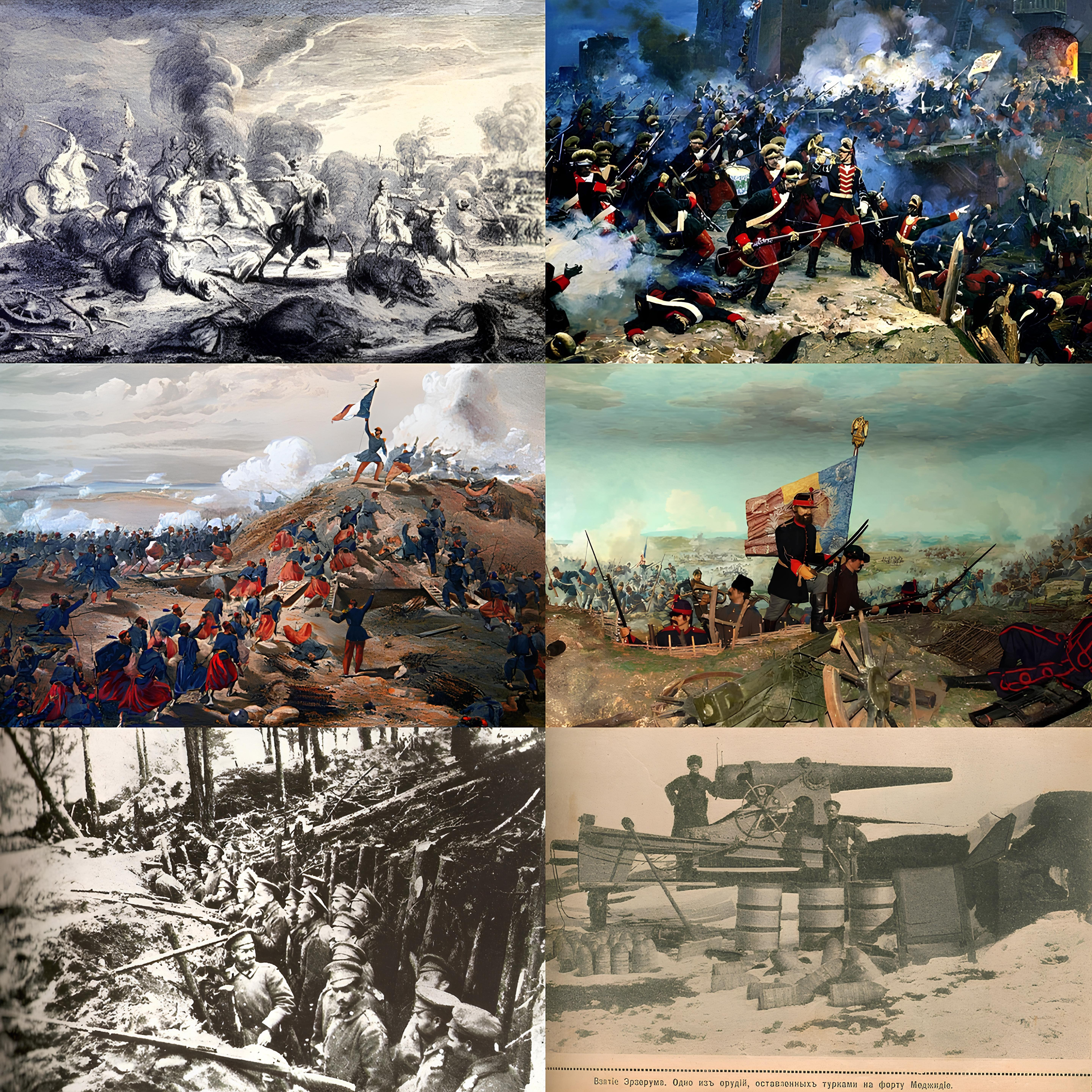
- Left-to-right from top: Siege of Ochakov (1737), Siege of Izmail (1790), Siege of Sevastopol (1854–1855), Siege of Plevna (1877), Battle of Sarikamish (1914–1915), Battle of Erzurum (1916)
Date	1568–1918 (350 years)
Location	Eastern Europe and Western Asia
Result	Military campaigns largely resulted in Russian victories, with the exception of Ottoman victories in the Pruth River Campaign and the Crimean War; Russian Empire collapsed in 1917 and succeeded by the Union of Soviet Socialist Republics in 1922; Ottoman Empire partitioned between 1918 and 1922 and succeeded by the Republic of Turkey in 1923
Territorial changes	Ottomans permanently lose Crimea, most of Bessarabia and parts of modern Ukraine, and most of the Caucasus

Belligerents
Tsardom of Russia (until 1721); Russian Empire (1721–1917); Russian Republic (1917); Russian SFSR (1917–1918)	Ottoman Empire; Vassals: Crimea; Egypt

Units involved
Army of the Tsardom of Russia; Army of Peter the Great; Imperial Russian Army; Imperial Russian Navy	Military of the Ottoman Empire; • Ottoman Navy

The Russo-Turkish wars or the Russo-Ottoman wars began in 1568 and continued intermittently until 1918. They consisted of twelve conflicts in total, making them one of the longest series of wars in the history of Europe. All but four of these wars ended in losses for the Ottoman Empire, which was undergoing a period of stagnation and decline. Conversely, they showcased the ascendancy of the Russian Empire as a significant European power after Peter the Great oversaw extensive modernization efforts in the early 18th century. Ultimately, however, the end of the Russo-Turkish wars came about with the dissolution of the two belligerents' respective states as a consequence of World War I: the Russian Empire collapsed in 1917 and was ultimately succeeded by the Union of Soviet Socialist Republics in 1922; while the Ottoman Empire was partitioned between 1918 and 1922 and succeeded by the Republic of Turkey in 1923.

== History ==
=== Initial and intermediate phases (1568–1739) ===
==== Russia before Peter the Great ====
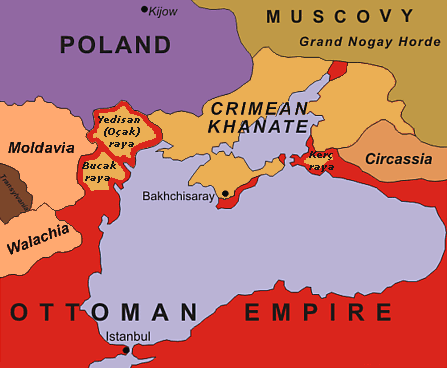
The Crimean Khanate in about 1600. Note that the areas marked Poland and Muscovy were claimed rather than administered.

The first Russo-Turkish War (1568–1570) occurred after the conquest of Kazan and Astrakhan by the Russian tsar Ivan the Terrible. The Ottoman Sultan Selim II tried to squeeze the Russians out of the lower Volga by sending a military expedition to Astrakhan in 1569. The Turkish expedition ended in disaster for the Ottoman army, which could not take Astrakhan and almost completely perished in the steppes, while the Ottoman fleet was wrecked by a storm in the Sea of Azov. The peace treaty between the two sides cemented Russia's rule on the Volga, but allowed the Ottoman Empire to obtain a number of commercial benefits. The Crimean Khanate, an Ottoman vassal, continued its expansion against the Tsardom of Russia, burning down Moscow in 1571, but was defeated at the Battle of Molodi in 1572.

The next conflict between Russia and Turkey began 100 years later as part of the struggle for the territory of Ukraine. While Russia conquered Left-bank Ukraine after the Russo-Polish War (1654–1667), the Ottoman Empire, in the course of the Polish–Ottoman War (1672–1676), spread its rule over all of right-bank Ukraine with the support of its vassal, Petro Doroshenko (1665–1672). The latter's pro-Ottoman policy caused disapproval among many Ukrainian Cossacks, who would elect Ivan Samoilovich as sole Hetman of all Ukraine in 1674. In 1676, Russian troops captured Chigirin and overthrew Doroshenko, who was exiled to Russia. In 1677, the Ottoman army tried to retake Chigirin, but was defeated. In 1678, the Ottoman army was finally able to take Chigirin after a bloody assault, but here the Ottoman expansion to the northeast was stopped. In 1679–80, the Russians repelled the attacks of the Crimean Tatars and signed the Treaty of Bakhchisarai in 1681, which established the Russo-Turkish border on the Dnieper River.

==== Russia during and after Peter the Great ====
Russia joined the European Holy League (Austria, Poland, Venice) in 1686. During the war, the Russian army organized the Crimean campaigns of 1687 and 1689 and the Azov campaigns (1695–96). In the light of Russia's preparations for the war with Sweden and other countries' signing the Treaty of Karlowitz with Turkey in 1699, the Russian government signed the Treaty of Constantinople with the Ottoman Empire in 1700. Following the results of peace, Russia managed to annex Azov and get access to the Sea of Azov.

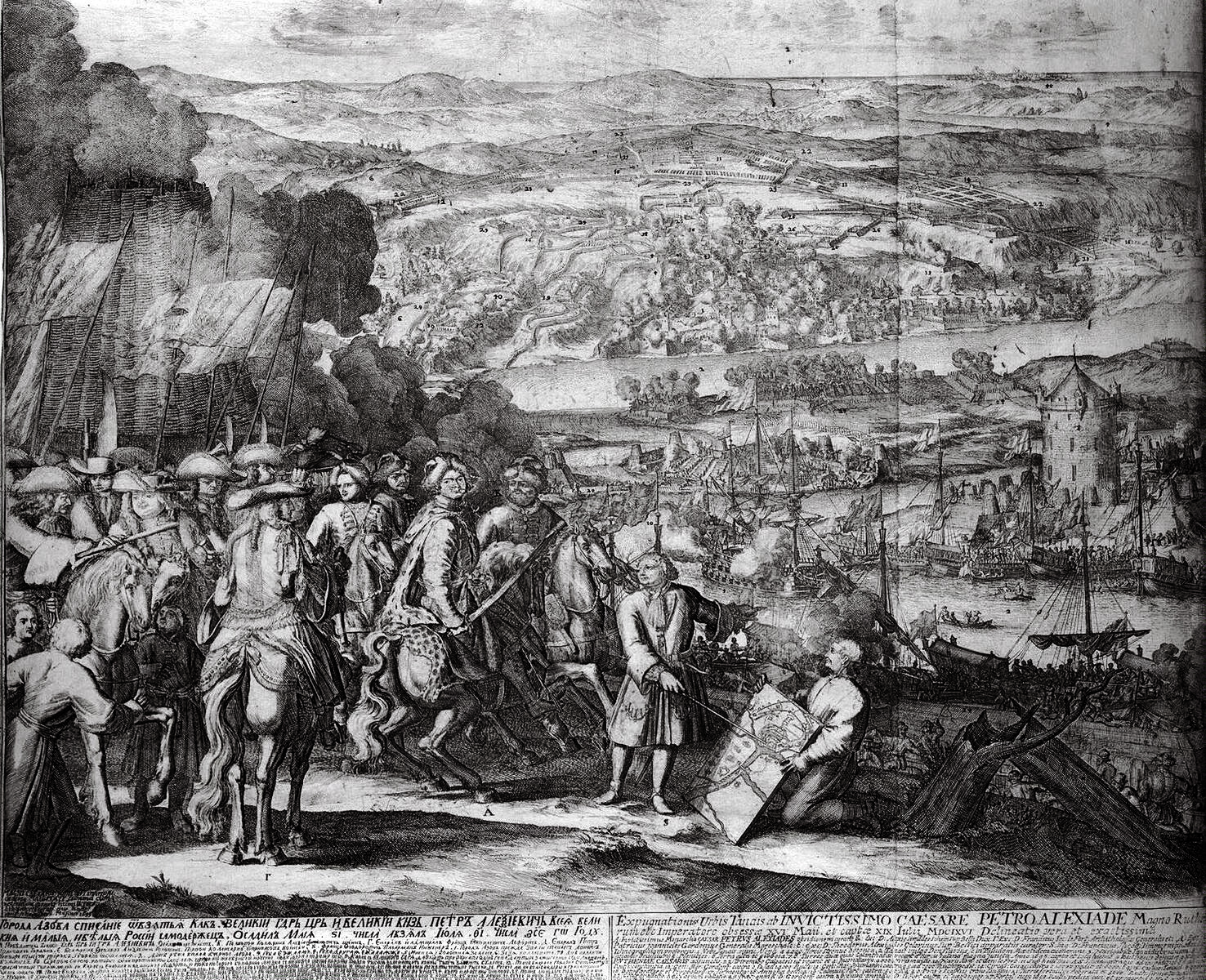
Capture of Azov by the troops of Peter the Great in 1696

After the Russians had defeated the Swedes and the pro-Swedish Empire Ukrainian Cossacks led by Ivan Mazepa in the Battle of Poltava in 1709, Charles XII of Sweden managed to persuade the Ottoman Sultan Ahmed III to declare war on Russia on November 20, 1710. The Prut campaign of Peter the Great ended very unsuccessfully for Russia. The Russian army, led by the tsar, was surrounded by a superior Turkish-Tatar army and was forced to agree to unfavorable peace conditions, according to which it returned the previously captured Azov to the Ottoman Empire.

By the late 17th century, Safavid Iran, which neighbored both empires and had been one of the greatest rivals for Turkey for centuries (16th–19th centuries), had been heavily declining. Taking advantage of the situation, Russia and the Ottoman Empire conquered swaths of its territory comprising contemporary Dagestan, Azerbaijan, and Northern Iran, which was taken by Peter I in the Russo-Persian War (1722–1723); the Ottomans took the territory to the west, comprising modern day Armenia, parts of Eastern Anatolia, as well as western Iran. The gains by both were confirmed in the Treaty of Constantinople (1724). For a few years, they bordered each other along a large territory in the Caucasus, which caused further frictions.

Russia managed to secure a favourable international situation by signing treaties with Persia in 1732 and 1735. These returned all Iranian territories gained since 1722 in the North and South Caucasus and Northern Iran, and avoided war with the emerging leader of Persia, Nader Shah. The treaties had other diplomatically favourable aspects as they established a Russo-Iranian alliance against Turkey, as Persia was at war with the Ottoman Empire. In the meantime Russia was also supporting the accession to the Polish throne of Augustus III in the War of the Polish Succession (1733–35), over the French-nominated Stanisław Leszczyński. Austria had been Russia's ally since 1726.

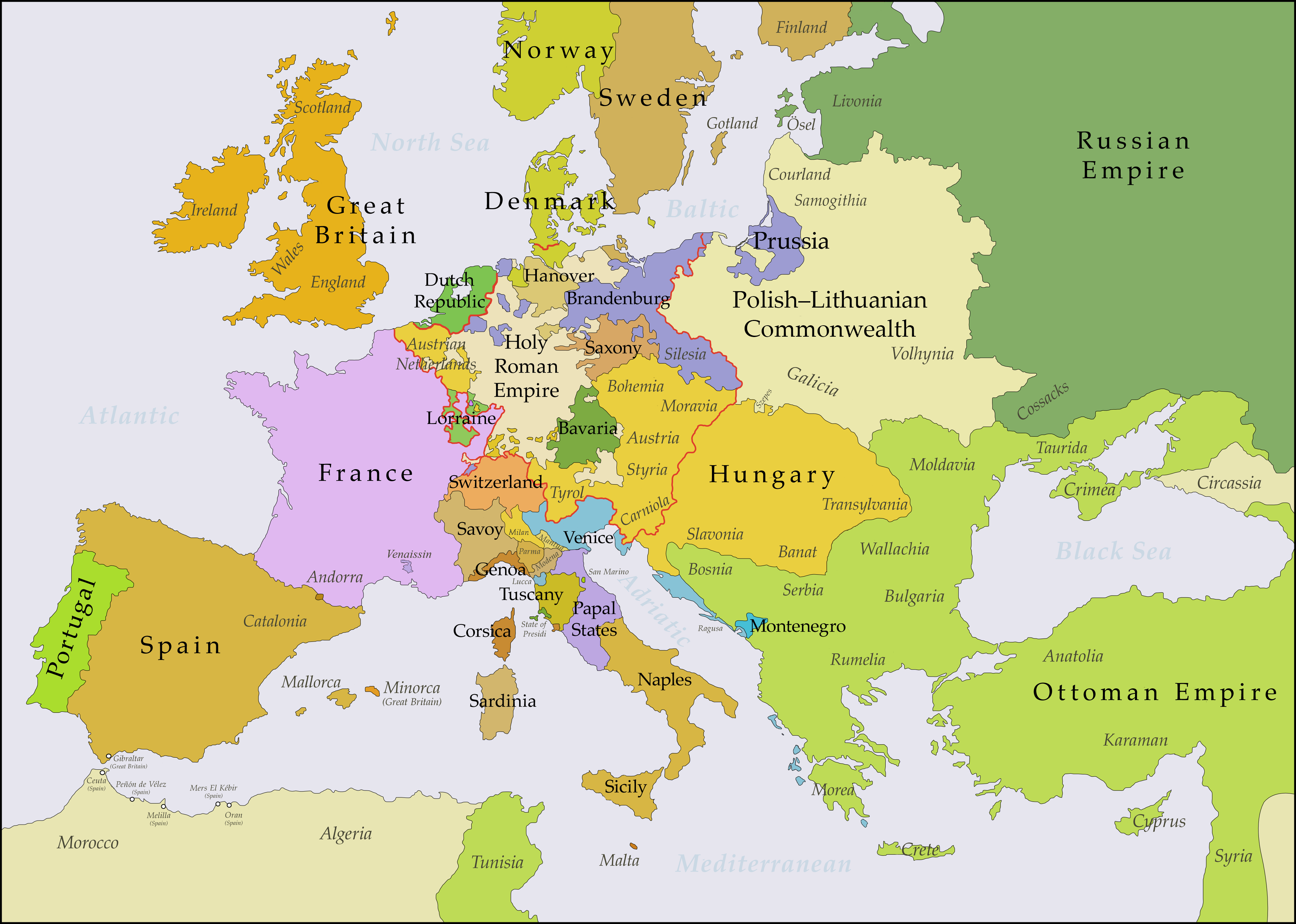
Europe before the Russo-Turkish War of 1768–1774

Russia entered into another war with the Ottoman Empire in 1736, prompted by raids on Ukraine by Crimean Tatars and the military campaign of the Crimean khan in the Caucasus. In May 1736, the Russian army launched an invasion of the Crimean peninsula and burned the capital of the Crimean Khanate, Bakhchysarai. On June 19, the Russian Don army under the command of General Peter Lacy captured Azov. In July 1737, the Münnich army took by storm the Ottoman fortress of Ochakov. The Lacy army (now 40,000 strong) marched into the Crimea the same month, inflicting some defeats on the army of the Crimean Khan and capturing Karasubazar. Lacy and his soldiers had to leave the Crimea, however, due to lack of supplies.

Austria entered the war against Turkey in July 1737 but was defeated a number of times. In August, Russia, Austria and Turkey began negotiations in Nemirov, which would turn out to be fruitless. There were no significant military operations in 1738. The Russian army had to leave Ochakov and Kinburn due to a plague outbreak. In 1739, the Münnich army crossed the Dnieper, defeated the Ottoman Empire at Stavuchany, and occupied the fortress of Khotin and Iaşi. However, Austria was defeated by the Ottoman Empire once again and signed a separate peace treaty on August 21. This, coupled with the imminent threat of Swedish invasion, forced Russia to sign the Treaty of Niš with Turkey on September 18, ending the war.

=== Gradual Ottoman defeat (1768–1878) ===
==== Russian advances under Catherine the Great ====
Following a border incident at Balta, Sultan Mustafa III declared war on Russia on September 25, 1768. The Turks formed an alliance with the Polish opposition forces of the Bar Confederation, while Russia was supported by Great Britain, which offered naval advisers to the Imperial Russian Navy.

In January 1769, a 70-thousand Turkish-Tatar army led by Crimean Khan Qırım Giray invaded the lands of central Ukraine. Crimean Tatars, Turks and Nogais ravaged New Serbia, took a significant number of slaves. Their raid was repulsed by the garrison of the Fortress of St. Elizabeth, after which the movement to the Black Sea continued troops of General Rumyantsev.

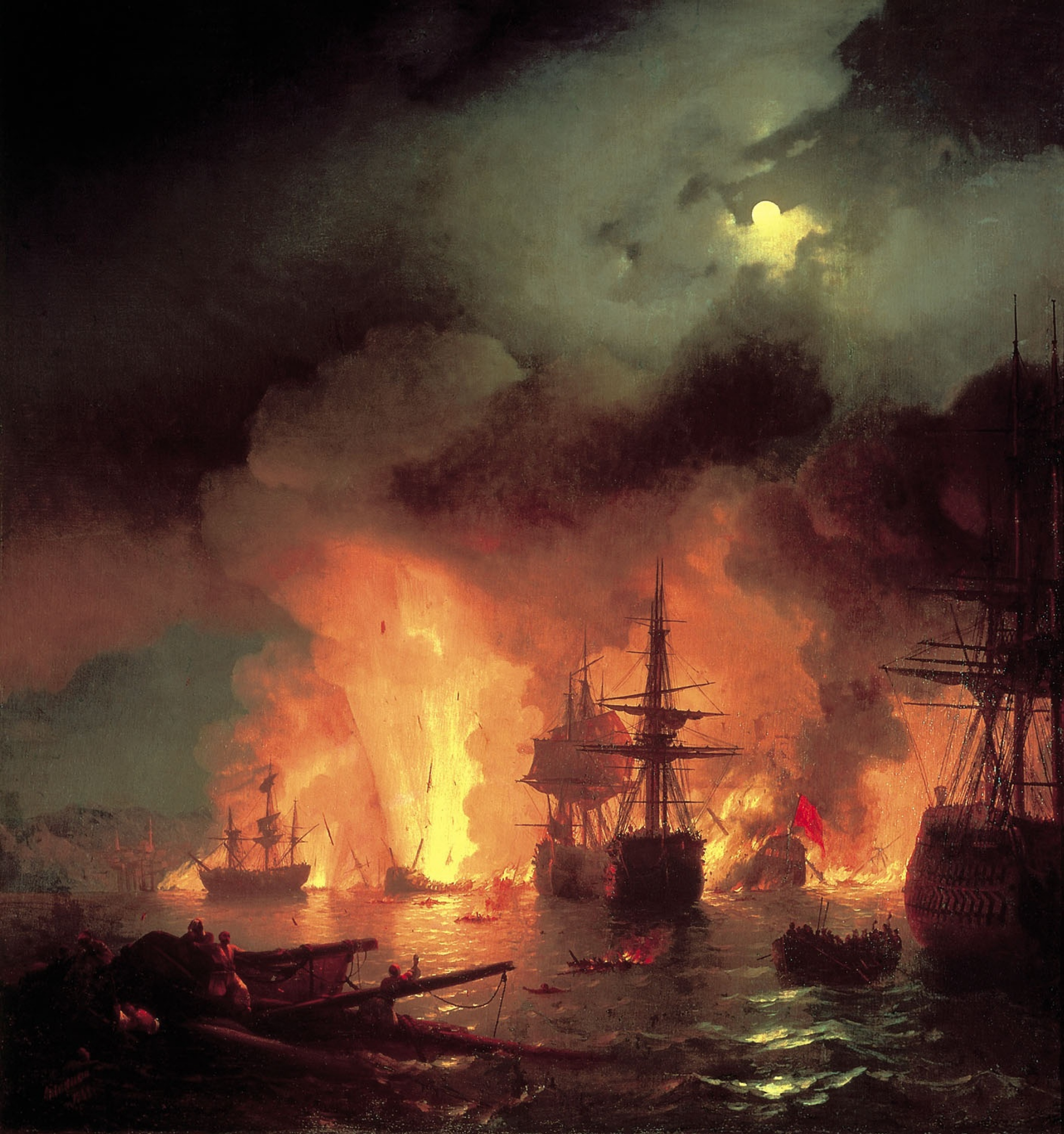
The destruction of the Ottoman fleet in Battle of Chesma

The Polish opposition was defeated by Alexander Suvorov, who was then transferred to the Ottoman theatre of operations, where in 1773 and 1774 he won several minor and major battles following the previous grand successes of the Russian Field-Marshal Pyotr Rumyantsev at Larga and Kagul.

Naval operations of the Russian Baltic Fleet in the Mediterranean yielded victories under the command of Aleksei Orlov. In 1771, Egypt and Syria rebelled against Ottoman rule, while the Russian fleet totally destroyed the Ottoman Navy at the Battle of Chesma.

On July 21, 1774, the Ottoman Empire signed the Treaty of Küçük Kaynarca, which formally granted independence to the Crimean Khanate, but in reality it became dependent on Russia. Russia received 4.5 million rubles and two key seaports allowing direct access to the Black Sea. It also marked the first time that a foreign power directly interfered in the affairs of the Sublime Porte, as the treaty gave Russia protector status over Turkey's Orthodox Christian subjects.

In 1783, Russia annexed the Crimean Khanate. In the same year, Russia established its protectorate over the Kingdom of Kartli-Kakheti according to the Treaty of Georgievsk. In 1787, Empress Catherine II made a triumphant trip across the Crimea, accompanied by representatives of foreign courts and her ally, Joseph II, Holy Roman Emperor. These events and the friction caused by mutual complaints of infringements of the Treaty of Küçük Kaynarca, which had closed the previous war, stirred up public opinion in Constantinople, and the British ambassador lent his support to the war party.

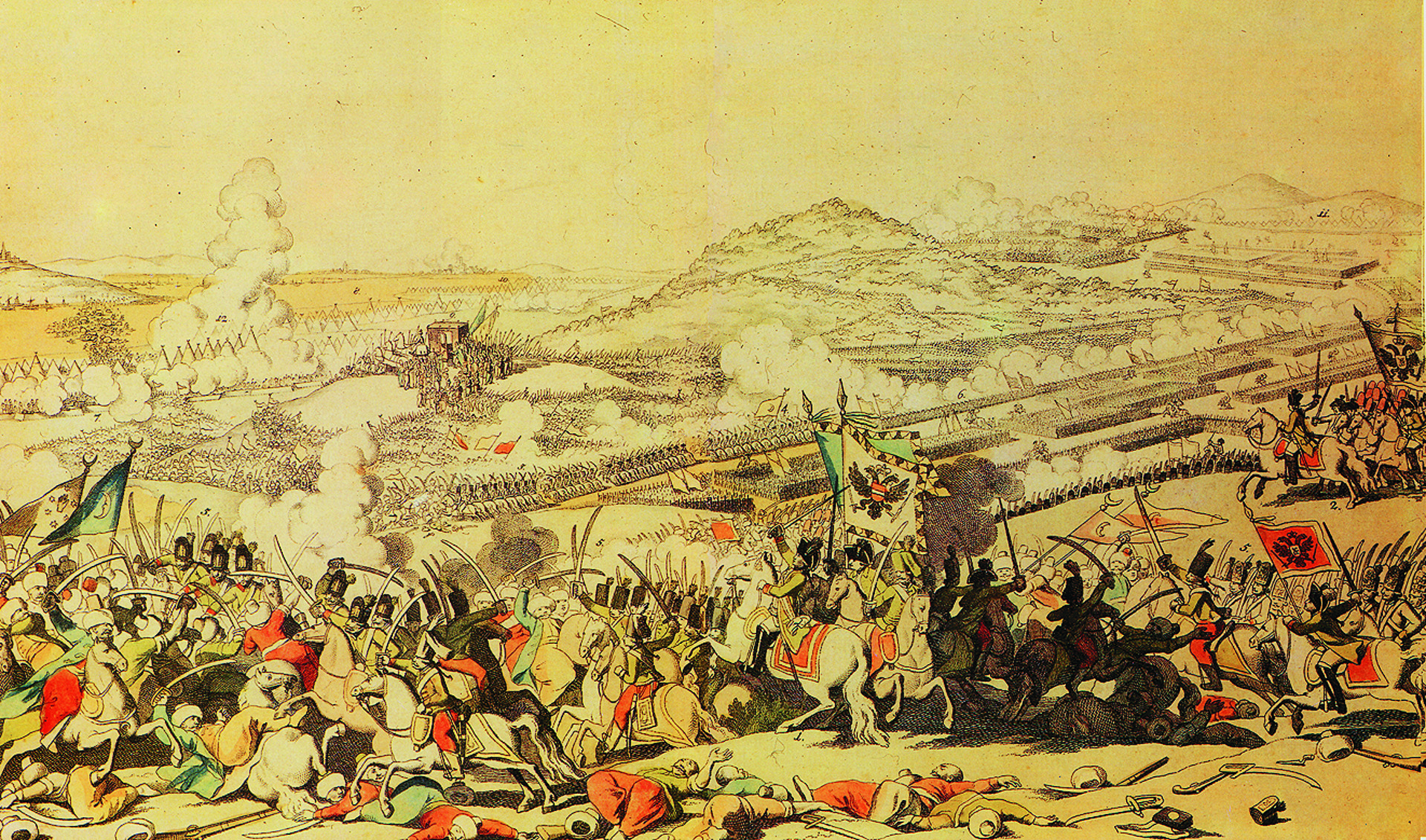
Clash between Russo-Austrian and Turkish troops in the Battle of Rymnik, 1788

In 1787 the Ottomans demanded that Russia vacate the Crimea. Russia declared war, but Ottoman preparations were inadequate and the moment was ill-chosen, now that Russia and Austria were in alliance, a fact that came to light only after events were already in motion. The Turks drove back the Austrians from Mehadia and overran the Banat (1789); but in Moldavia Field-Marshal Pyotr Rumyantsev was successful and captured Iaşi and Khotyn. Ottoman generals were incompetent, and the army mutinous; expeditions for the relief of Bender and Akkerman failed, Belgrade was taken by the Austrians, The Russian army under the command of Alexander Suvorov defeated the Turks in the Battle of Rymnik and captured Izmail. The fall of Anapa completed the series of Ottoman disasters. The Russian Black Sea Fleet, created just a few years earlier, under the command of Admiral Ushakov, inflicted a series of defeats on the Turkish Fleet and seized the initiative in the Black Sea.

Sultan Selim III was nervous to restore his country's prestige by a victory before making peace, but the condition of his military rendered this hope unavailing. Turkey signed an assistance pact with Prussia on 31 January 1790, but received no help during the war. Accordingly, the Treaty of Jassy was signed with Russia on 9 January 1792, by which the Crimea and Ochakov were left to Russia, the Dniester was made the frontier in Europe, and the Asiatic frontier remained unchanged.

==== Engagements in the 19th century ====
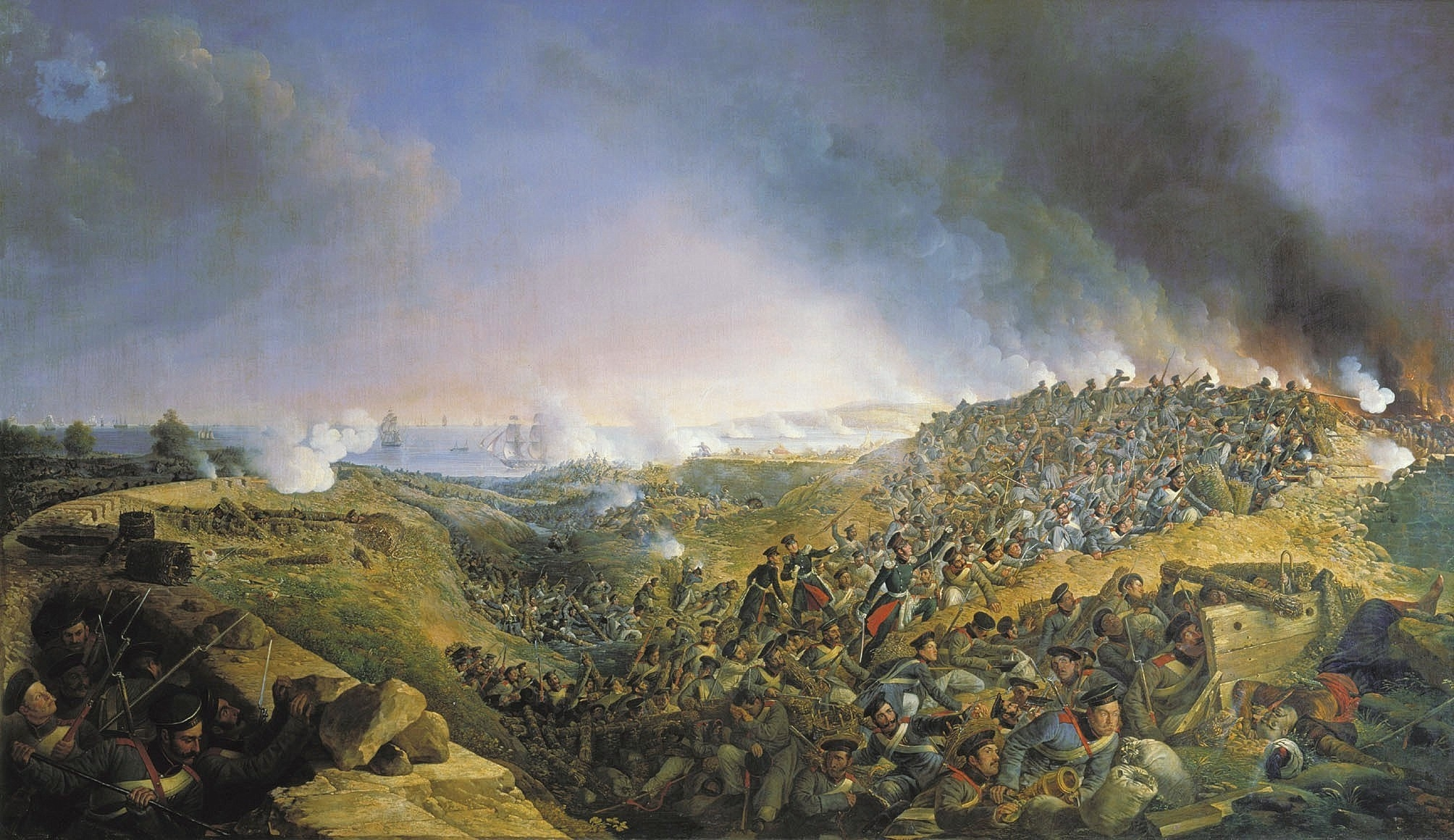
Russian siege of Varna in Ottoman-ruled Bulgaria, July–September 1828

Gábor Ágoston attributes the decline of Ottoman power relative to Russia to the reactionary Janissaries:

Despite all these treatises and efforts at modernization, the Janissaries and their allies managed to derail Sultan Selim III's Western-style military, bureaucratic, and financial reforms through a coup, even killing the sultan himself. It was not until the 1830s that fundamental reforms could be started under Mahmud II, who destroyed the Janissaries in 1826, a century and a quarter after Peter the Great's liquidation of the strel'tsy.

In 1806, the Ottoman Empire incited by Napoleonic France started a new war. The long six-year war for Russia took place in parallel with the Russo-Persian War, the Russo-Swedish War and the War of the Fourth Coalition. Despite this, in the decisive campaign of 1811, the Russian army of Kutuzov defeated the Ottoman army on the Danube, which made it possible to conclude a peace treaty beneficial for Russia, according to which Russia gained Bessarabia.

The Ottoman Empire had maintained military parity with Russia until the second half of the eighteenth century, but by the 1820s the Ottoman armies were unable to put down the Greek War of Independence in southern Greece. The great powers of Europe intervened, and assisted Greece with its independence. After the Battle of Navarino and the Russo-Turkish War (1828–1829), in which the Russian army first crossed the Balkan Mountains and took Adrianople, Turkey recognized the independence of Greece and the transition of the Black Sea coast of the Caucasus to Russia. Thus Greece became the first independent country created out of a section of the Ottoman Empire. Russian Empire aspirations for a section of the empire and bases on Russia's southern flank provoked British fears over naval domination of the Mediterranean and control of the land route to the Indian subcontinent.

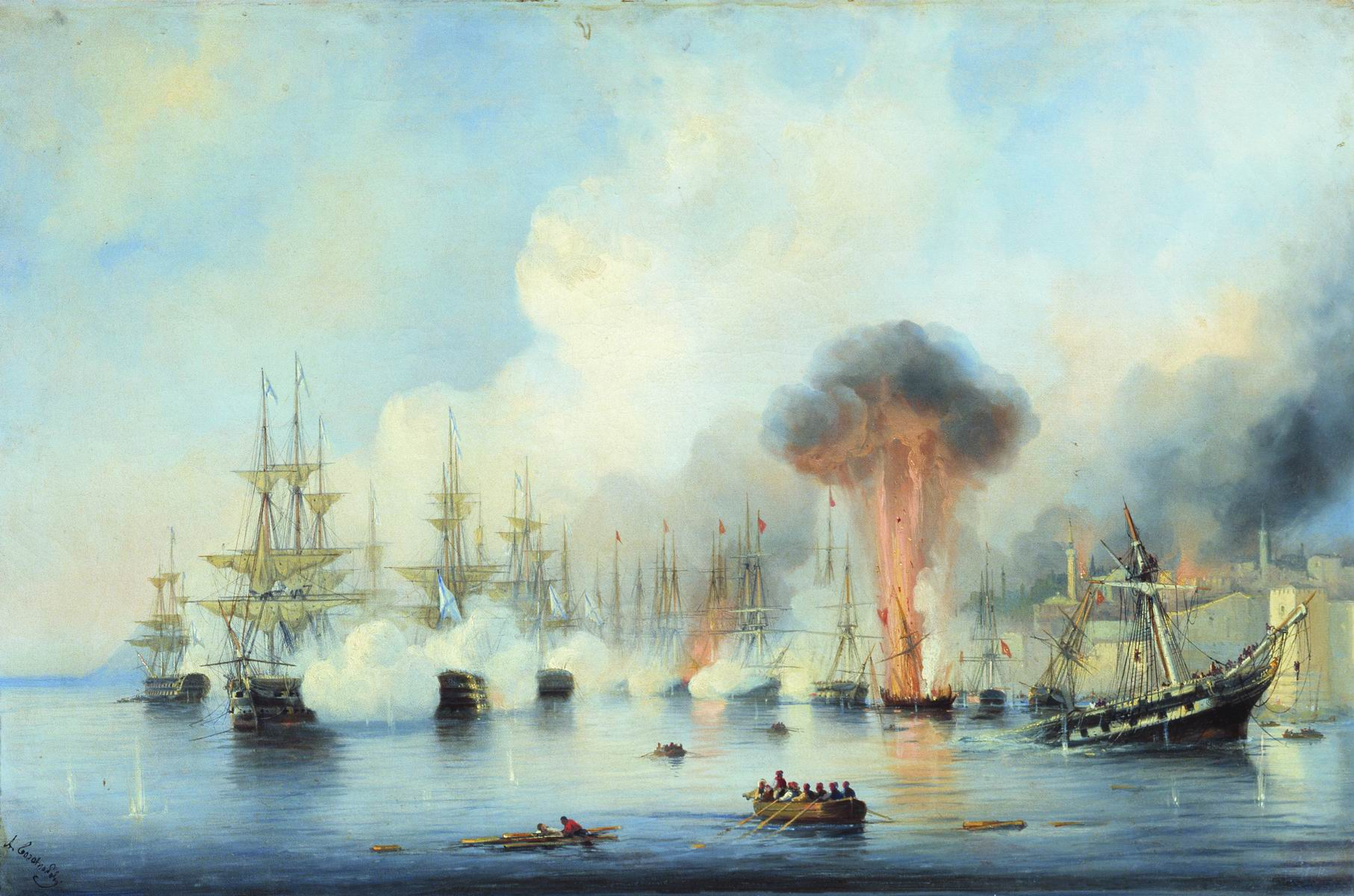
The destruction of the Ottoman fleet in Battle of Sinop

When in 1853 Russia destroyed the entire Ottoman fleet at Sinop, Britain and France concluded that armed intervention on the side of the Ottomans was the only way to halt a massive Russian expansion. Even though the Ottomans and Russians were on opposing sides, the roots of the ensuing Crimean War lay in the rivalry between the British and the Russians. The war ended unfavorably for the Russians, with the Paris peace of 1856. The wars declined Ottoman morale and turned it helpless, illustrating that modern technology and superior weaponry were the most important part of a modern army, something the Ottoman Empire was sorely lacking. While fighting alongside the British, French, and even the Sardinians, the Ottomans could see how far they had fallen behind. Things began to change after the Crimean War.

One of these changes arose as Europeans began to see commercial opportunity in the empire and the money entering via trade dramatically increased. The government also received a great deal of extra money from a uniform tax system with little corruption. The Sultan got a tighter grip on the provincial beys and increased the tribute they had to pay. However, Sultan Abdülaziz, used much of this money on furnishing and creating great palaces to rival the ones in England and France, which he had visited. The empire was undergoing a revolution, and throughout Anatolia a new Ottoman nationalism was appearing. It seemed as though it might be possible for the empire to turn its decline around.

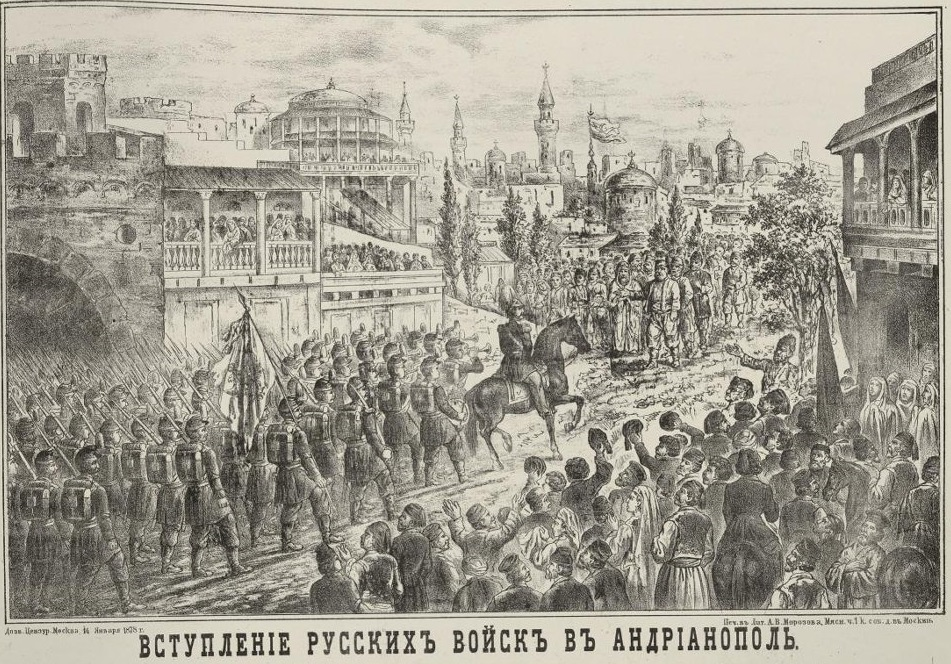
Russian troops entering Adrianople

The monetary and governmental collapse combined with a new threat from Russia began the final stages of the Empire's collapse. Russia had been forced by the Crimean War to give up its ambitions of conquering the Ottoman capital of Constantinople and taking control of the Bosphorus. Instead it decided to focus on gaining power in the Balkans. The population of much of the Balkans were Slavs, as were the Russians. They also mainly followed the Eastern Orthodox Church, as did the Russians. When new movements in Russia, such as that of the Slavophiles, started to enter the region, it became agitated and prone to revolution. When the government in Constantinople tried to initiate measures to prevent an economic collapse throughout the empire, it touched off a revolt in Herzegovina in 1875. The revolt in Herzegovina quickly spread to Bosnia and then Bulgaria. Soon Serbia also entered the war against the Turks. These revolts were the first test of the new Modern Ottoman Army. Even though they were not up to Western European standards, the army fought effectively and brutally; during the war, the Ottomans carried out the Batak massacre in 1876. Januarius MacGahan, a journalist of the New York Herald and the London The Daily News wrote of the terrible happenings after his visit to Batak with Eugene Schuyler. According to most sources, around 5,000 people were massacred in Batak alone. The total number of victims in the April uprising according to most estimates around 15,000, which is supported by Eugene Schuyler's report, published in The Daily News, according to which at least 15,000 persons were killed during the April Uprising in addition to 36 villages in three districts being buried. According to Donald Quataert around 1,000 Muslims were killed by Christian Bulgarians and consequently 3,700 Christians were killed by Muslims.

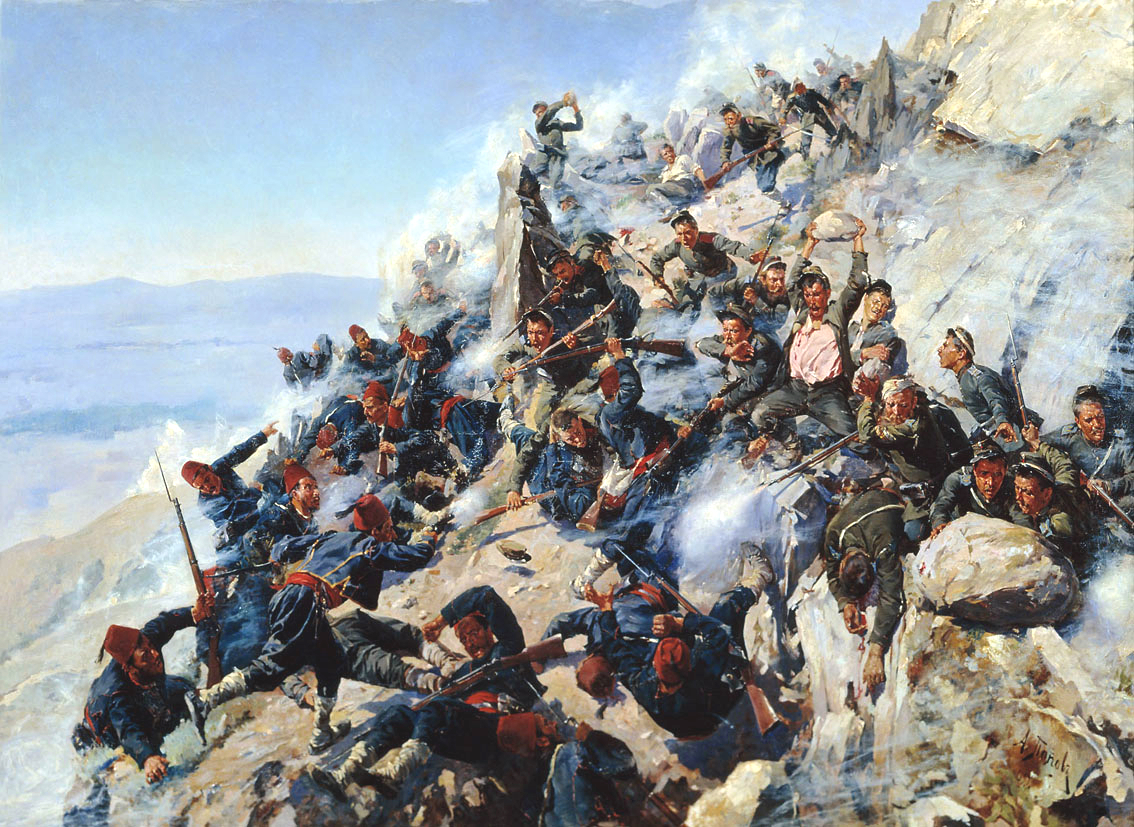
The Russian and Bulgarian defence of Shipka Pass against Turkish troops was crucial for the independence of Bulgaria.

Soon the Balkan rebellions were beginning to falter. In Europe, papers were filled with reports of Ottoman soldiers killing thousands of Slavs. Even in Great Britain William Ewart Gladstone published his account of Ottoman atrocities in his Bulgarian Horrors and the Question of the East. The uprisings raised a chance for Russia, and (Prince Gorchakov) and Austria-Hungary (Count Andrássy), who made the secret Reichstadt Agreement on July 8, 1876, on partitioning the Balkan peninsula depending on the outcome.

The following year a new Russo-Turkish war had begun. Despite fighting better than they ever had before, the modernised Ottoman armies still were not equal to the Imperial Russian Army. This time there was no help from abroad; in truth, many European nations supported the Russian war, as long as it did not get too close to Constantinople. Ten and a half months later when the war had ended, the age of Ottoman domination over the Balkans was over. In the Balkans, the Russian army, having crossed the Danube, captured the Shipka Pass. The Turkish army of Osman Nuri Pasha, after a stubborn struggle, surrendered to Plevna. After that, the Russian army crossed the Balkan Mountains, defeated the remaining Turkish troops and reached the approaches to Constantinople. In the Caucasus, the Turkish army held back the Russian offensive, but after a defeat at the Battle of Aladzha, retreated to Erzurum, after which the Russians took Kars. On the Black Sea, the Ottoman fleet had a colossal advantage, since the Russian Black Sea Fleet had not recovered from the Crimean War. Despite this, the hostilities on the Black Sea in this war were not important.

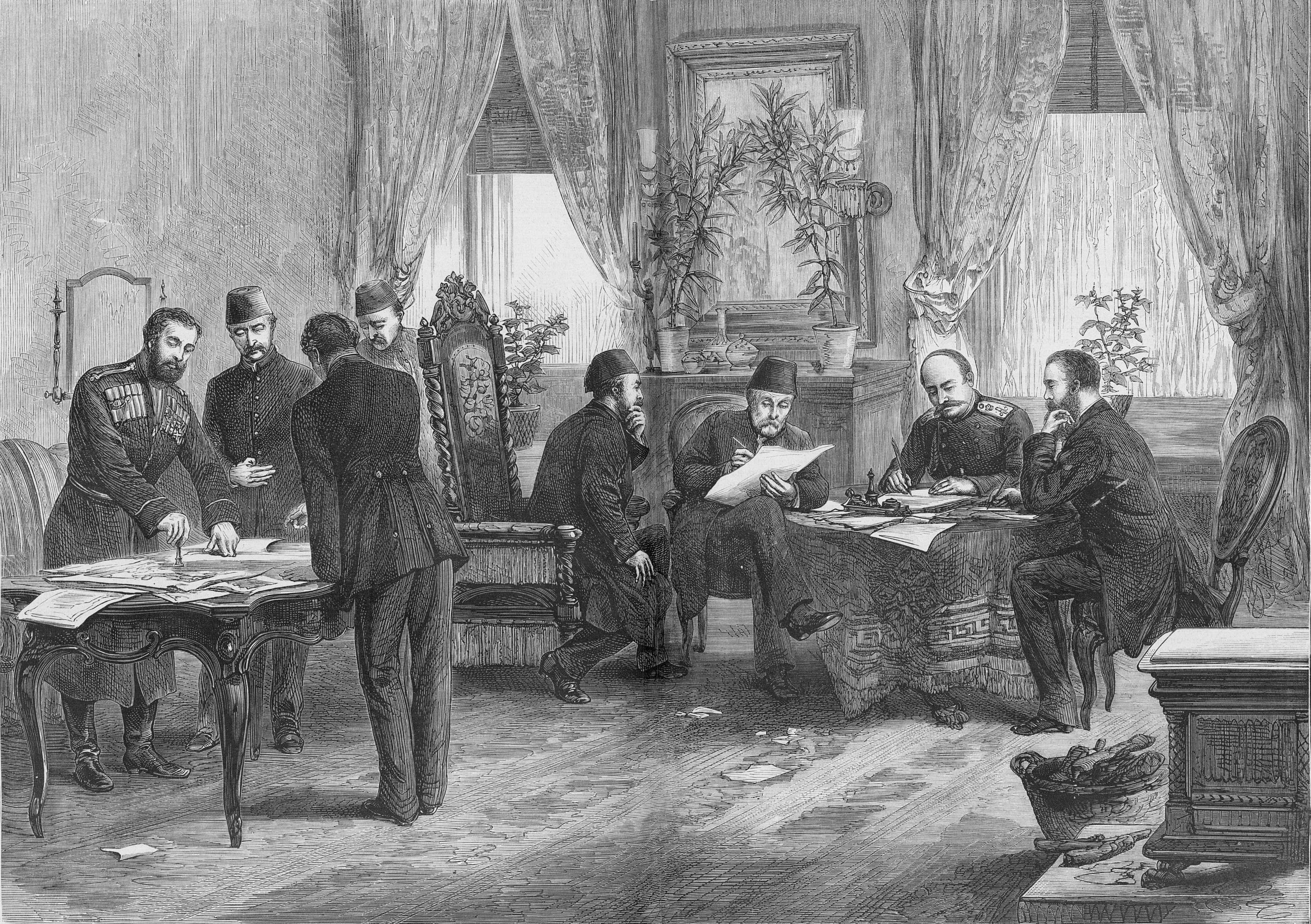
Negotiations for San Stefano Agreement

In response to the Russian proximity to the straits, the British, against the wishes of the new Sultan Abdul Hamid II, intervened in the war. A large task force representing British naval supremacy entered the straits of Marmara and anchored in view of both the Dolmabahçe Palace and the Russian army. Looking at the prospect of a British entry into the war, the Russians decided to settle the dispute. The Treaty of San Stefano gave Romania and Montenegro their independence, Serbia and Russia each received extra territory, Austria-Hungary was given control over Bosnia, and Bulgaria was given almost complete autonomy. The hope of the Sultan was that the other great powers would oppose such a one-sided resolution and a conference would be held to revise it. His hope became reality and in 1878 the Congress of Berlin was held where Germany promised to be an "honest broker" in the treaty's revision. In the new treaty Bulgarian territory was decreased and the war indemnities were cancelled. The conference also again hurt Anglo-Ottoman relations by giving the British the island of Cyprus. While annoyed at British Prime Minister Benjamin Disraeli, the Sultan had nothing but praise for Otto von Bismarck who forced many of the major concessions upon Russia. These close Germano-Ottoman relations would persist until both empires' very end.

The Russian extension in this century developed with the main theme of supporting independence of Ottomans' former provinces and then bringing all of the Slav peoples of the Balkans under Bulgaria or using Armenians in the east sets the stage. At the end of the century from Russian perspective; Romania, Serbia and Montenegro and the autonomy of Bulgaria was achieved. That alarmed the Great Powers. After the Congress of Berlin the Russian expansion was controlled through stopping the expansion of Bulgaria. The Russian public felt that at the end of Congress of Berlin thousands of Russian soldiers had died for nothing.

==== Sovereignty of Caucasian territories ====
During the Greek uprising, the Russian Empire reached the Ottoman borders in the Caucasus, which were located in the southwest of the region, as well as northeastern Anatolia. Under the terms of the Treaty of Adrianople, the Ottoman Empire recognized Russian sovereignty over western Georgia, which was formerly under Ottoman suzerainty, and recognized Russian domination of present-day Armenia, which had been conquered a year earlier (1828) by the Russians from Qajar Iran through the Treaty of Turkmenchay. After the war of 1877–78, Russia also received Kars and Ardahan.

=== Collapse of Russian and Ottoman empires (1914–1923) ===
The area of Russian occupation of northeast Turkey and the Caucasus (Western Armenia).

During the early months of World War I, Kars was a key military objective for the Ottoman army. Enver Pasha who pushed the Ottoman Empire into World War I, needed a victory against the Russians to defend his position. He collected an army on the eastern border. The army was badly defeated under Enver's command at the Battle of Sarikamish January 2, 1915, against Nikolai Yudenich. This defeat was more due to the winter weather and bad planning, given the fact that Russians were actually preparing to evacuate Kars. With the loss of the eastern army, Ottoman defenses crumbled with further small battles and the Russian army succeeded in advancing as far west as Erzincan. The Ottoman army suffered the next heavy defeat in the Battle of Erzurum in 1916, after which the Russian army captured the whole of Western Armenia. After the 1916 campaign, the front remained stable until the Russian Revolution.

The collapse of the Russian army after the 1917 revolution left only thinly spread Armenian units to resist the inevitable Ottoman counter-attack. The newly declared First Republic of Armenia took over Kars in April 1918. That same year in March, the Baku Commune was established in the Azerbaijan Democratic Republic. The commune later became the Centrocaspian Dictatorship, in turn conquered by the Ottoman Islamic Army of the Caucasus, then shortly by the Triple Entente and finally the Bolsheviks. Defeat on other fronts caused the Ottoman Empire to surrender and withdraw forces. Both the Armenian and Azerbaijani Republics ended up being part of the Soviet Union in 1920. The Soviet-Turkish border was established under the Treaty of Moscow (1921).

== List of conflicts ==
	Name	Date	Result
1	First Russo-Turkish War	1568–1570	Russian victory
2	Russo-Crimean wars	1571–1572	1571: Crimean-Ottoman victory: Moscow is burned down 1572: Russo-Cossack victory: a second Crimean-Ottoman invasion is repelled at the Battle of Molodi
3	Second Russo-Turkish War (Note: In fact, this is the third armed conflict between Russians and Turks, but in the conflict of 1571-1572 there was no direct declaration of war, and Turkish units acted only as support for the Crimean army)	1676–1681	Disputed (Note: The result of the war, which was ended by the Treaty of Bakhchisarai, is Ottoman victory. Some yet another historian contends it was a Russian victory. While some historians state the war was indecisive (stalemate).); Treaty of Bakhchisarai
4	Third Russo-Turkish War (subset of the Great Turkish War)	1686–1700	Habsburg, Polish-Lithuanian, Russian, and Venetian victory Treaty of Karlowitz and Treaty of Constantinople: Russia gains possession of Azov and the fortresses of Taganrog, Pavlovsk, and Mius
5	Fourth Russo-Turkish War (subset of the Great Northern War)	1710–1713	Ottoman victory Treaty of Pruth and Treaty of Adrianople (1713): Russia cedes Azov to the Ottoman Empire and demolishes the fortresses of Taganrog, Kodak, Novobogoroditskaya, and Kamenny Zaton; Russia agrees to stop meddling in the affairs of the Polish–Lithuanian Commonwealth
6	Fifth Russo-Turkish War (also known as the Austro-Russian-Turkish War)	1735–1739	Treaty of Belgrade: Habsburgs cede the Kingdom of Serbia with Belgrade, the southern part of the Banat of Temeswar and northern Bosnia to the Ottomans, and the Banat of Craiova (Oltenia), gained by the Treaty of Passarowitz in 1718, to Wallachia (an Ottoman subject), and set the demarcation line to the rivers Sava and Danube; Treaty of Niš (3 October 1739): Russia gives up territorial claims to Ottoman Moldova and Bessarabia; Ottomans cede the demilitarized Azov to Russia, as well as the Zaporozhye region
7	Sixth Russo-Turkish War	1768–1774	Russian victory Treaty of Küçük Kaynarca: Ottoman Empire cedes Kerch, Enikale, Kabardia and part of Yedisan to Russia; Crimean Khanate becomes a Russian client state
8	Seventh Russo-Turkish War	1787–1792	Russian victory Treaty of Jassy: Russia annexes Ozi, Ottomans recognize Russian annexation of the Crimean Khanate
9	Eighth Russo-Turkish War	1806–1812	Disputed; Treaty of Bucharest (1812): Russia annexes Bessarabia
10	Ninth Russo-Turkish War	1828–1829	Russian victory Treaty of Adrianople (1829): Russia occupies the Danubian Principalities, Greek independence from the Ottoman Empire
11	Crimean War	1853–1856	Ottoman, British, French and Sardinian victory Treaty of Paris (1856): mutual demilitarization of the Black Sea, Russia cedes Southern Bessarabia and recognizes de jure Ottoman suzerainty over Danubian Principalities
12	Eleventh Russo-Turkish War	1877–1878	Russian and allied victory De jure independence of Romania, Serbia and Montenegro and de facto independence of Bulgaria from the Ottoman Empire; Territory of Kars Oblast and Batum Oblast ceded to Russia
13	World War I: Caucasus Campaign; XV Corps actions on the Eastern Front; Islamic Army of the Caucasus; Persian Campaign	1914–1918	Indecisive Treaty of Batum: Return to the pre-war borders in 1918

== See also ==
- Foreign policy of the Russian Empire
- Foreign policy of the Ottoman Empire
- Crimean–Nogai slave raids in Eastern Europe
  - Russo-Crimean Wars
- List of Serbian–Ottoman conflicts
- Caucasian War
- Russo-Persian Wars

== Sources ==
- Gumilev, Lev (2023) [1996]. От Руси к России [For Rus' to Russia]. Эксклюзивная классика (revised ed.). Moscow: AST. ISBN 978-5-17-153845-3.
- Davies, Brian (2006). "Muscovy at war and peace". In Perrie, Maureen (ed.). The Cambridge History of Russia From Early Rus to 1689. Vol. 1. Cambridge University Press.
- Davies, Brian (2007). Warfare, State and Society on the Black Sea Steppe, 1500–1700. Routledge. ISBN 978-0-203-96176-6.
- Kollmann, Nancy Shields (2017). The Russia Empire, 1450-1801. Oxford University Press.
- Lewitter, Lucjan Ryszard. "The Russo-Polish Treaty of 1686 and Its Antecedents." Polish Review (1964): 5-29 online.
- Murphey, Rhoads (1999). Ottoman Warfare, 1500-1700. Taylor & Francis.
- Stone, David R. (2006). A Military History of Russia: From Ivan the Terrible to the War in Chechnya. Greenwood Publishing.
