= Toma Cantacuzino =

Romanian statesman and Russian general

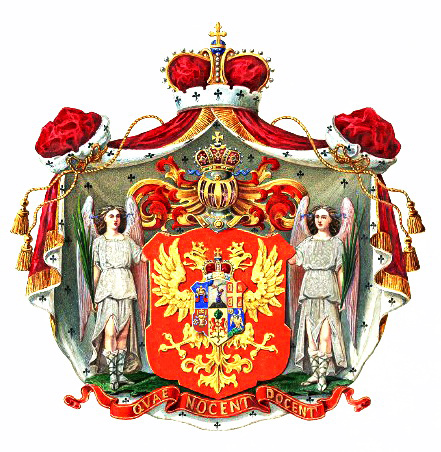
Coat of arms of the Cantacuzino family from a Russian armorial

Toma Cantacuzino (c. 1670, Bucharest, Wallachia – 22 December 1721, Trukhnovo, Russia) was a Romanian Spătar and general in the Tsarist army. He was a member of the Cantacuzino family and cousin of Constantin Brâncoveanu and Ștefan Cantacuzino.

== Biography ==
Toma Cantacuzino was born around 1670 in Bucharest. His father was Matei Cantacuzino and mother was Bălașa Drugănescu. Both parents died when he was young and was raised by his uncle, Șerban Cantacuzino. Brâncoveanu's Italian secretary, Anton Maria Del Chiaro, described Toma as a brave man with a vast culture and a good connoisseur of the Latin and Italian languages.

In 1693, he was made second Logofăt and then assigned as Grand Postelnic in 1704. In 1706, he was made Grand Spătar which placed the entire cavalry of the Wallachian army under his command.

In April 1711, the Treaty of Lutsk was signed secretly between Dimitrie Cantemir and Peter the Great, following which the Principality of Moldavia sided with Russia in the anti-Ottoman struggle. Constantin Brâncoveanu hesitated to side with him. Toma Cantacuzino, who commanded the cavalry of Wallachia, openly sided with the Russians on 22 June despite Brâncoveanu's orders. This betrayal contributed to the execution of Brâncoveanu and his four children.

After joining the Russians with eight Wallachian cavalry regiments, the Tsar named him major general and offered him the command of a dragoon regiment. He was then ordered to aid General Carl Ewald von Rönne in the capture of the Brăila fortress. After the conquest of Braila, Toma returned to his home in Filipeștii de Pădure on 25 July 1711, where he received the news of the conclusion of peace between the Sultan and the Tsar. In 1712, he went to the Russian Empire where the Tsar granted him the title of Count and appointed him as major general in the Russian imperial cavalry. In 1717, he brought his family to Russia after their lands were confiscated Prince Nicholas Mavrocordatos.

In December 1720, he received the command of the troops that supervised the construction of a canal that was supposed to connect the Baltic Sea and Sea of Azov. Due to the harsh northern climate, he died on 22 December 1721. He was transported to Moscow on 22 January 1722 where he was buried in the church of the Saint Nicholas Monastery.
