= Siege of Brăila (1711) =

- Part of the Russo-Turkish War (1710–1713)
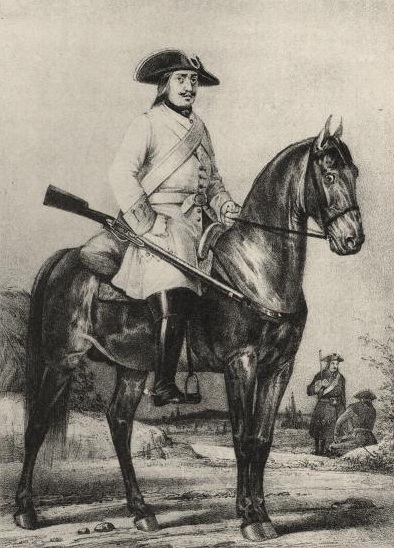
- Russian dragoon of Peter the Great's army
Date	7 – 14 July 1711 (13 – 14 July siege began)
Location	Brăila, Silistra Eyalet, Ottoman Empire (present-day Romania) 45°16′09.1″N 27°57′26.9″E
Result	Russian victory

Belligerents
Tsardom of Russia; Wallachian volunteers	Ottoman Empire

Commanders and leaders
Carl Rönne; Toma Cantacuzino	Daud Pasha

Strength
12,000 (5,000 engaged)	3,000

Casualties and losses
100 dead 300 wounded	800 killed Several hundred wounded

The siege of Brăila was the military operation of the Russian cavalry detachment of General Carl Ewald von Rönne to capture large city of Brăila took place 7 – 14 July 1711 during Pruth River campaign. The Russian army fought with the Ottoman army in order to get supplies for the main troops under the command of Peter the Great, the raid ended with the Russian victory and the capture of the fortress, but by this time the Treaty of the Pruth had been concluded.

== Siege ==
As the Russo-Moldavian army moved along the Prut, a portion of the Russian army under General Carl Ewald von Rönne moved towards Brăila, a major port town located on the left bank of the Danube, in Wallachia, but administered directly by the Ottomans as a kaza. Joined by the Wallachian cavalry commanded by Toma Cantacuzino, the forces of the Russian detachment consisting of 12,000 dragoons reached the Măxineni Monastery on 10 July, where 7 Ottoman soldiers were captured. The soldiers reported to von Rönne that the garrison of Brăila consisted of 3,000 people and fortified. The Russians allocated about 5,000 for the attack.

At about 10 a.m., the Russians attacked the vorstadt and captured it with a rapid onslaught, forcing the Ottomans to retreat to the main castle. The sides suffered heavy losses: 100 killed and 300 wounded for Russians and 800 killed and several hundred wounded for Ottomans. On 14 July, the fortress surrendered, Rönne released the garrison, but completely unarmed, excluding the commandant. Three days later, after learning about the truce, the Russians allowed the garrison to return and retreated.
