= Hasan (Janissary secretary) =

Ottoman civil servant and writer

Hasan was an Ottoman civil servant who wrote about his experiences during the Russo-Ottoman War of 1710–11.

== Life ==
Hasan was probably born in 1640s. His epithet was Kurdi or Kurd. Sometimes written as Hasan Kurdi and sometimes Kurd Hasan which both indicates he was Kurdish in origin. Muslim borns were accepted to Janissary Corps after late 17th century because of the growing demand and need to muskteers. He became a Janissary in 1656 and participated in various campaigns. After a campaign to Podolia (now in Ukraine) in 1674, he transferred to civil service. In 1682 he was appointed to Crete (now in Greece), then an Ottoman possession, where he served in the cities of Chania, Rethymno and Heraklion. In 1694 he served in Lesbos and in 1697 in Euboea, two other islands also now a part of Greece. In 1704 he was promoted to the secretariat of the Janissary corps, one of the highest civilian posts of the army. He was present in the Pruth River Campaign in 1711. His diary during the campaign is a valuable source of information about it.

== Pruth campaign ==
When Peter the Great of the Russian Empire pursued Charles XII of Sweden into Ottoman territory after the Battle of Poltava, the Ottoman Porte decided to check the Russian advance. Ottoman Grand Vizier Baltacı Mehmet Pasha besieged the Russian army at the Pruth River (now marking the border between Moldova and Romania) valley and Peter agreed to sign the Treaty of Pruth in which he gave up his plans against the Ottoman Empire and Sweden.

== Hasan's diary ==
According to Orientalist Franz Babinger, Hasan's diary (also called the History of Russia) survives in three copies; in the Topkapi Palace in Istanbul, in the Oriental Institute of St Petersburg, and in the Bayerische Staatsbibliothek in Munich . It is written in Ottoman Turkish. It was published by İş Bankası Yayınları (Publishing house of İş Bankası) in 2008 in modern Turkish (edited by Hakan Yıldız) with the title Prut Seferi'ni Beyanımdır ("My statement on the Pruth Campaign"). It consists of 37 sections. The first section is titled "Malice minded Russian king who doesn't keep his promise" The last section is a summary of the casualties. There are two more sections. One is an autobiography of Hasan and the other one is the review of the battle. But the wording of the review is very different from the rest of the diary. For example, in the 37 sections the events are narrated in military terms; but the review is full of mythology. Hakan Yıldız the editor of Hasan's diary interprets this contradiction as a later addition by a second person.
