= Ağa Yusuf Pasha =

Grand Vizier of the Ottoman Empire from 1711 to 1712

Grand Vizier of the Ottoman Empire
- In office 20 November 1711 – 11 November 1712
- Monarch: Ahmed III
- Preceded by: Baltacı Mehmed Pasha
- Succeeded by: Nişancı Süleyman Pasha

Personal details
- Died: Rhodes, Ottoman Greece
- Ethnicity: Georgian

Military service
- Allegiance: Ottoman Army
- Branch/service: Janissary corps
- Rank: Agha
- Battles/wars: Pruth River Campaign

Ağa Yusuf Pasha (Yusuf Pasha the Agha), also known as Gürcü Yusuf Pasha (Yusuf Pasha the Georgian), was an 18th-century Ottoman military leader and Grand vizier.

Yusuf Pasha was of Georgian origin and a devshirme. In 1710, he was appointed Agha of the Janissaries, commander of the Janissary corps. As a military leader, he became successful during the Pruth River Campaign (1710–1711). By the Treaty of Pruth (1711), Peter the Great of the Russian Empire agreed to provide a free passage for King Charles XII of Sweden to return to his country. The next year, Ağa Yusuf Pasha was appointed grand vizier. However, although a component commander, he lacked the skill of a statesman. When Peter the Great refused to allow a free passage for Charles XII, Ottoman Sultan Ahmed III (r. 1703–1730) decided to declare war on Russia. But Ağa Yusuf Pasha persuaded the Sultan to give up the idea believing that Peter the Great would finally follow the terms of the treaty. However, the Russian Tsar was still reluctant, and the angered Sultan dismissed Ağa Yusuf Pasha from his post as grand vizier on 11 November 1712. Although he was exiled to the island of Rhodes, soon he was executed.
