= Treaty of Constantinople (1700) =

1700 treaty between Russia and the Ottoman Empire

The Treaty of Constantinople or Istanbul was signed on 13 July 1700 between the Tsardom of Russia and the Ottoman Empire. It ended the Russo-Turkish War of 1686-1700. Russian tsar Peter the Great secured possession of the Azov region and freed his forces to participate in the Great Northern War. The treaty was superseded by the Treaty of the Pruth in 1711, after the Ottoman Empire became involved in this war.

== Background ==
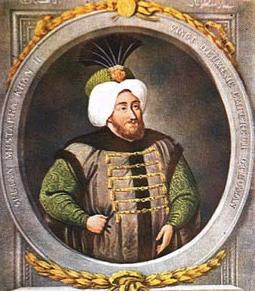
Sultan Mustafa II

As a member of the anti-Ottoman alliance ("Holy League"), the Tsardom of Russia had fought against the Ottoman Empire in the eastern theater of the Great Turkish War (Russo-Turkish War (1686–1700)). When the other members of the league — the Holy Roman Empire, the Republic of Venice and the Polish–Lithuanian Commonwealth - had reached their war aims, they concluded a peace with the Ottoman sultan Mustafa II at Karlowitz (1699), which completely ignored Russian interests. The respective negotiations had begun in 1698, when Russia was still campaigning in the lower Dnjepr area and the Strait of Kerch, connecting the Sea of Azov to the Black Sea. Russian tsar Peter the Great joined the negotiations in person and concluded a two-years truce with the Ottoman Empire in Karlowitz (Sremski Karlovci) on 25 December 1698 (O.S.) / 26 January 1699. At this stage, a final Russo-Ottoman settlement was prevented by the discrepancy between Peter's demands, which included protection of the Christians in the Ottoman Balkan provinces, and the military position of Russia, as well as the lack of support by the other Holy League members.

In the fall, the tsar sent Yemelyan Ignatievich Ukraintsev to the sultan's court, the Porte at Constantinople (Istanbul), to negotiate a peace. Ukraintsev arrived on a Russian war ship, the 46-gun frigate Krepost in the early fall of 1699. The primary Russian objectives were Ottoman recognition of the Russian war gains around Azov and a free access to the Black Sea for Russia's commercial vessels. When the negotiations progressed slowly and Peter the Great came under time pressure to attack the Swedish Empire in the Great Northern War (see below), he urged Ukraintsev to come to a peace soon, and the Russian condition of Black Sea access was dropped.

== Terms ==
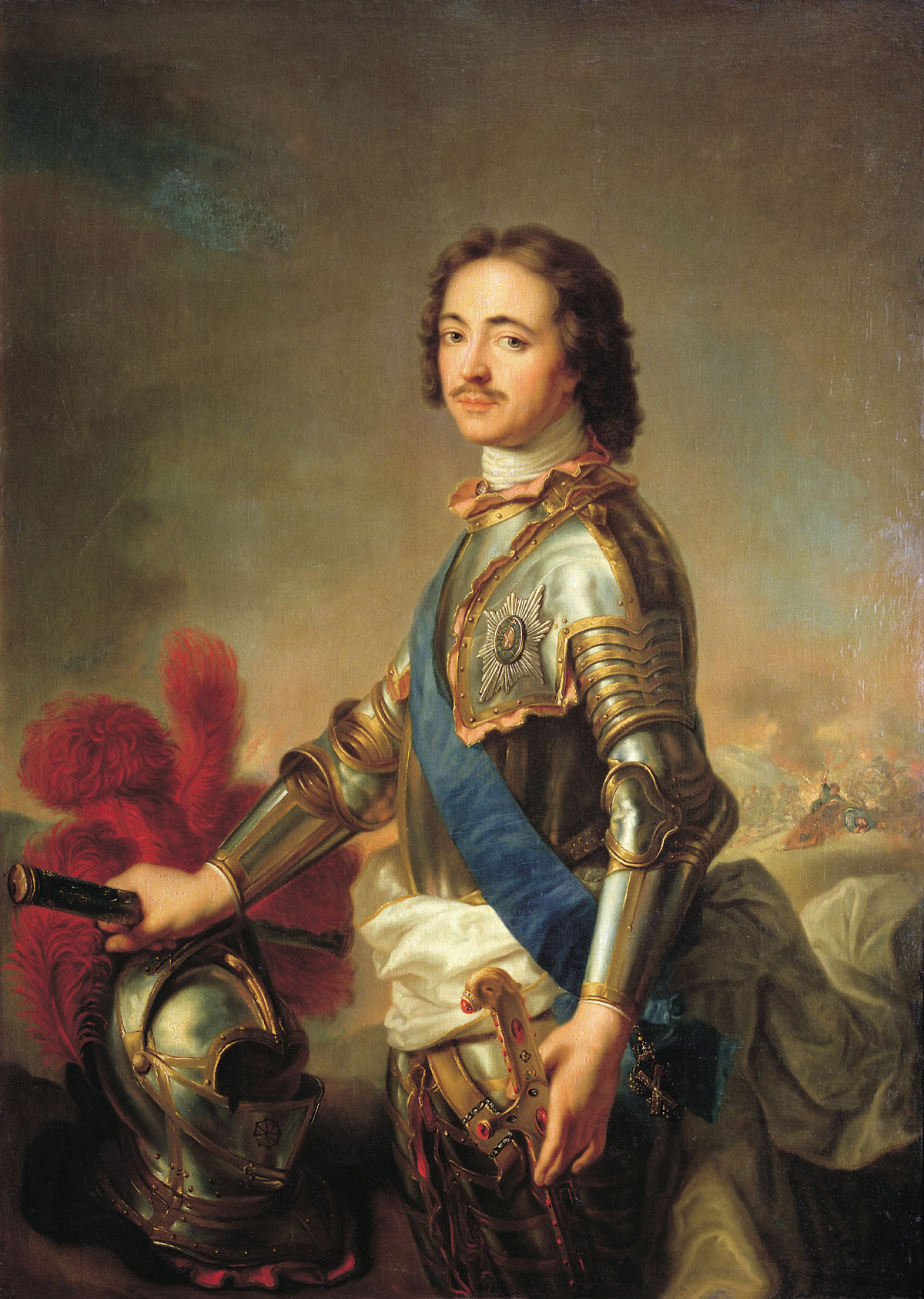
Tsar Peter the Great

The treaty was concluded on 3 July (O.S.) / 13 July 1700 in Constantinople. The Tsardom of Russia and the Ottoman Empire agreed on a truce set to expire in thirty years. The sultan recognized Russia's possession of the Azov area, including Asov and the newly built fortresses of Taganrog, Pavlovsk, and Mius. Russia dropped her claims to the Kerch Strait, but was relieved from paying the annual tribute to the Crimean Khanate paid since the occupation of Muscovy by the Golden Horde. The fortresses along the Dnieper river, razed by Russian forces, were returned to the Ottoman Empire. The lower Dniepr area, south of the Zaporozhian Sich, and the area between Perekop and Miuskiy Gorodok was declared a demilitarized zone. The sultan asserted that his subordinates, the Crimean Tatars, would not attack Russia; in turn, the tsar promised that his subordinates, the Don Cossacks and Zaporozhian Cossacks, would not attack the Ottoman Empire.

Both parties promised not to build any fortifications along the border. The Ottoman Empire also promised to free Russian prisoners of war. The sultan further allowed free passage for Russian pilgrims to the Holy Land and a Russian diplomatic representation in Constantinople.

== Impact of the Great Northern War ==
The treaty's conclusion and its supersession in 1710 was closely tied to the Great Northern War, which had started shortly before its conclusion. Peter the Great had negotiated a three-front assault on the Swedish Empire with his allies August the Strong of Saxony and Poland–Lithuania and Frederik IV of Denmark-Norway: Peter was to attack Swedish Ingria, August was to attack Swedish Livonia, and Frederik was to attack Sweden's ally Holstein-Gottorp. Peter's attack however was conditional, it was agreed that it would only start after the Russo-Ottoman peace was concluded. As a consequence, the Russian attack was delayed to a point where Denmark-Norway was already defeated when Peter the Great marched his army out of Moscow, enabling Sweden to face the Russian attack on Ingria and successfully repulse it.

The Ottoman Empire became involved in the war nine years later, when Charles XII of Sweden was defeated by Peter the Great in the Battle of Poltava and subsequently encamped the remnants of his army in Ottoman Bender. This led to another confrontation between the sultan and the tsar, culminating in an Ottoman declaration of war and the unsuccessful Russian Pruth Campaign. As a consequence, the treaty of Constantinople was superseded by the Treaty of the Pruth (1711), by which Azov was returned to the sultan and subsequently razed, and the Treaty of Adrianople (1713), which restored peace between the Russian and Ottoman empires scheduled to last twenty-five years. Though the sultan declared war on Peter three times in the time between Pruth and Adrianople, no actual fighting occurred, thus the Pruth treaty effectively ended the Ottoman intervention in the Great Northern War.

== Sources ==
Bibliography

- Anderson, Matthew Smith (2000). Europe in the eighteenth century, 1713-1789. General history of Europe (4 ed.). Longman. ISBN 0-582-35744-6.
- Davies, Brian L. (2007). Warfare, state and society on the Black Sea steppe, 1500-1700. Warfare and history. Routledge. ISBN 0-415-23986-9.
- Frost, Robert I (2000). The Northern Wars. War, State and Society in Northeastern Europe 1558-1721. Longman. ISBN 978-0-582-06429-4.
- Oliva, Lawrence Jay (1969). Russia in the era of Peter the Great. New insights in history. Prentice-Hall.
- Phillips, Edward J. (1995). The founding of Russia's navy. Peter the Great and the Azov Fleet, 1688-1714. Contributions in military studies. Vol. 159. Greenwood Publishing Group. ISBN 0-313-29520-4.
- Torke, Hans-Joachim (1997). Einführung in die Geschichte Russlands (in German). C.H.Beck. ISBN 3-406-42304-3.
