= Treaty of Adrianople =

Treaty of Adrianople or Treaty of Edirne may refer to several treaties signed in Edirne (formerly Adrianople):

- Peace of Szeged (1444), between the Ottoman Empire and Hungary
- Truce of Adrianople (1547), between the Ottoman Empire and the Habsburgs
- Treaty of Adrianople (1568), between the Ottoman Empire and the Habsburgs
- Treaty of Adrianople (1713), between the Ottoman Empire and Russia
- Treaty of Adrianople (1829), between the Ottoman Empire and Russia
