= Carl Ewald von Rönne =

German-born Russian cavalry officer (1663–1716)

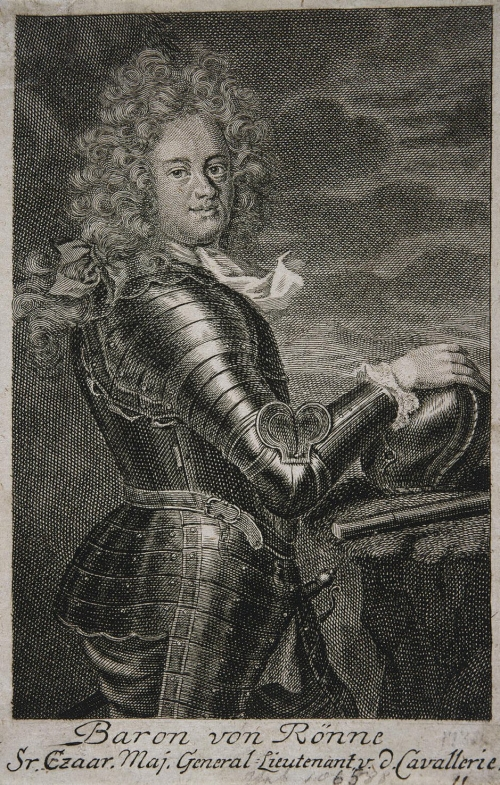
Engraving, early 18th century

Carl Ewald von Rönne (15 December 1663 – 29 December 1716) was a German-born Russian cavalry officer. He became General of the Cavalry in the Russian army of Peter the Great. He served in both the Great Northern War and in the Russo-Turkish War of 1710–1713. He also commanded the tsarist army in Ukraine from 1711 to 1716.

== Biography ==
His ancestors, who originally came from Bremen, later moved to Livonia. Carl Ewald von Rönne was born on 15 December 1663 in Courland. Rönne was in the Swedish service as a page from 1673. In 1683, he entered the Dutch service and began his officer career as a cornet in the cavalry. In 1692, he was promoted to captain and served in the service of the Electorate of Saxony in the army of General Patkul.

In 1702, Rönne entered the Tsar's service on the basis of a contract with the Russian Prince Dolgorukov, and in 1703, he became colonel of a dragoon regiment that also bore his name.

In July 1703, he defeated Swedish units in the Battle of Vyborg. He only lost 32 soldiers as compared to over 1,000 Swedish losses. Peter I witnessed the battle and appointed him commander of the conquered Nyenschanz fortress and subsequently the first commander of Saint Petersburg.

In May 1704, he became major general. He took part in the conquest of the cities of Narva and Tartu, defeating the Swedes under General Wolmar Anton von Schlippenbach. In 1705, Rönne became lieutenant general of the cavalry.

In 1706, a 3,000-man raiding party under the command of Carl Ewald von Rönne attacked a 13,000-man unit of Count Potozki in Windau, Duchy of Courland and Semigallia (now Latvia) and routed them. On July 3, 1708, Rönne took part in the Battle of Holowczyn, which was unsuccessful for the Russian army. On February 10, 1709, Rönne and his unit of ten dragoon regiments repelled the attack of the Swedish forces under the command of Charles XII. He successfully attacked the city of Krasnokutsk and almost captured the Swedish king.

On April 12, 1709, Rönne's units were attacked by the numerically significantly larger troops of the Swedish general Carl Kruse. Rönne was able to successfully repel the attack and pushed the Swedes across the Vorskla River.

In the Battle of Poltava on June 27, 1709, Rönne was wounded, after which he handed over command to General Rodion Baur. After this battle he was awarded the rank of general of cavalry. In 1710 he was appointed to the rank of general. On 14 July, 1711, Toma Cantacuzino and Rönne besieged and conquered Brăila.

From 1711 to 1715 Rönne was commander-in-chief of the Russian troops in Ukraine and from 1716 until his death commander-in-chief of the Russian corps in Poland.

== Participation in the battles ==
- 1702–1703 – conquest of Nöteborg (Schlüsselburg/Shlisselburg) and Nyenschanz
- 1703 – participation in the battle of Systerbäck as a commanding colonel
- 1704 – participation in the battles of Reval and Narva and the first victory, as commander-in-chief of an army, near Wesenberg
- 1705 – sieges of Mitau and Bauske
- 1706 – participation in the battle of Windau
- 1708 – the defeat at Golovchin/Holowczyn
- 1709 – participation in the battle of Poltava
- Participated in the siege and capture of Riga
- 1711 – the victory as commander-in-chief of a force at the siege of Brăila or Brailov

== Orders and awards ==
- Knight of the Order of Saint Andrew the First-Called
- Knight of the Order of the White Eagle (Poland)
- Knight of the Prussian Order of the Générosité
- He received the rarely awarded Order of Gratitude de la Reconnaissance from the Duke of Courland. The Duke also gave him the Bershof estate (1710) and he became pledgee of the Alt-Pönau (Kensingshof) estate (1711), both located in Courland.

== Family ==
Carl Ewald von Rönne was married to the Russian lady-in-waiting Anna Lucia de Preen. She was a daughter of Mr. Gustav von Preen from Mecklenburg and Dorothea von Manteuffel, heir to Puhren, Wilzen and Paddern.

After her husband's death, Anna Luzia became the chief steward to the widowed Anna Ioannovna, duchess in the Courland residence of Mitau. Anna Ioannovna was a daughter of Tsar Ivan V and the niece of Peter I and later ruled Russia as Tsarina from 1730 to 1740.

Children:

- Carl Johann Ernst Freiherr von Rönne (* 1700; † 1733), captain of Windau
