= Treaty of Lutsk =

1711 treaty between Russia and Moldavia

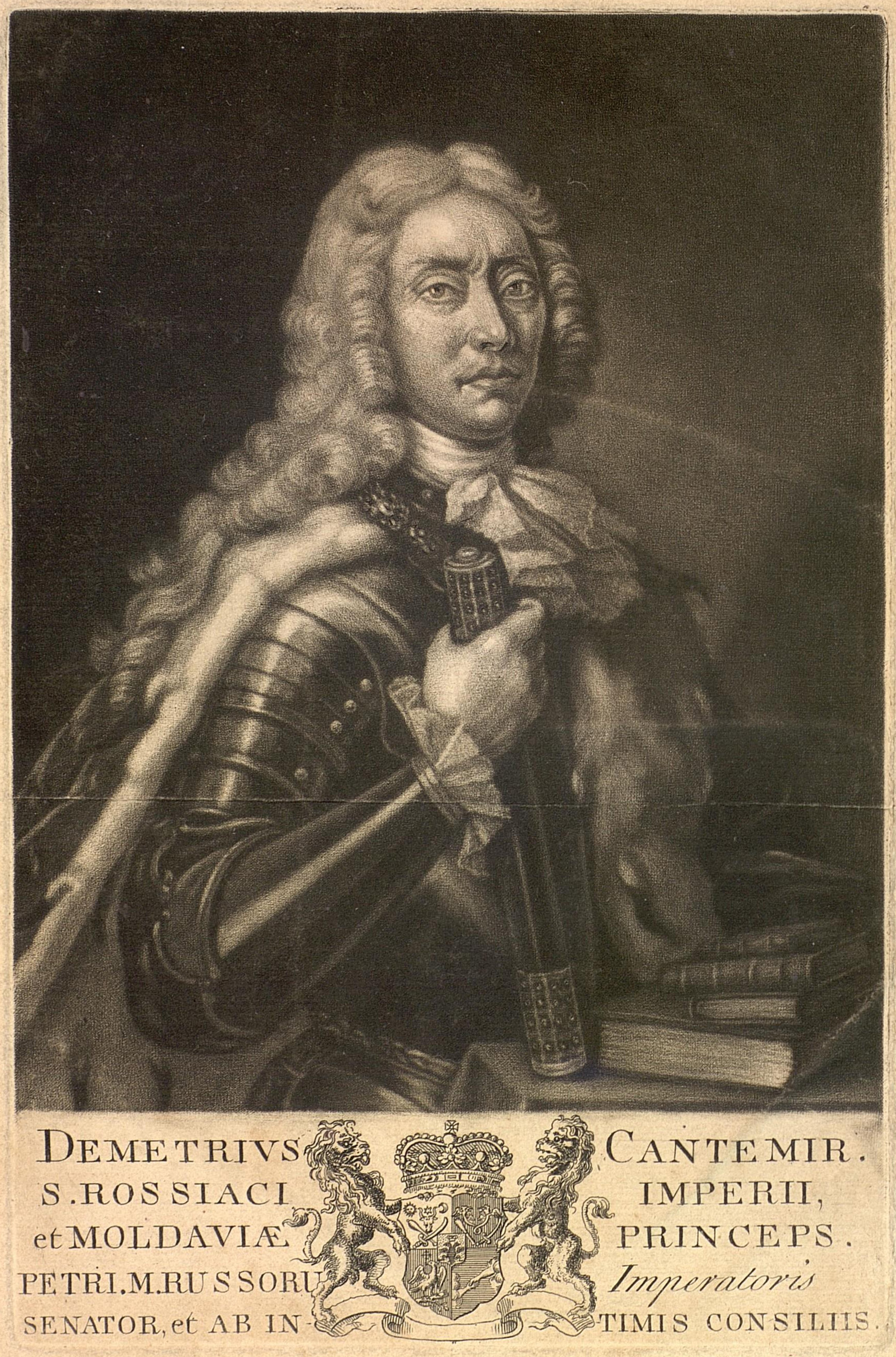
Portrait of Dimitrie Cantemir (1673–1723)

The Treaty of Lutsk was a secret agreement signed in Lutsk, Poland-Lithuania (now in Ukraine), between the Tsardom of Russia and the Principality of Moldavia on 13 April 1711, shortly after the outbreak of the Russo-Ottoman War of 1710–11. Moldavia supported Russia in its war against the Ottomans with troops and by allowing the Russian army to cross its territory and to place garrisons in Moldavian fortresses. The Moldavians were represented by the Metropolitan of Moldavia Ghedeon. The text of the treaty was elaborated entirely by Moldavian Hospodar Dimitrie Cantemir, who asked for Moldavia to be put under the protection of Russia in exchange for support in the war against the Ottomans.

The treaty lasted only a few months until 23 July 1711 (O.S. 12 July), by which time Russia had been defeated in the Pruth campaign, and Peter had been forced to sign the Treaty of the Pruth. The Treaty of Lutsk lost its validity, Moldavia remained an Ottoman vassal, and Dimitrie Cantemir fled to Russia.

== Terms ==
In the preamble and in Article I, Dimitrie Cantemir worships the tsar, receiving in return protection from Peter I for himself and for all the people of Moldavia. It is provided that the lord of Moldavia "with all the great boyars and her nobles and with the inhabitants of any state of the glorious Moldavian people" should henceforth be under the protection of the tsar and will take an oath of obedience at first in secret, until at the entry of the Russian armies into the principality and then, the voivode will carry his faith secretly "by correspondence and other means".

Article II makes the lord of Moldavia join the army of the Russian army.

Articles III to V provide that the heirs of the Russian throne do not have the right to rule in Moldavia or in the Wallachian land. In Moldavia, the reign is to be hereditary in the Cantemir family.

Article VI provides, "According to the old Moldovan custom, all power should be with the lord". The tsar cannot interfere in the internal affairs of Moldavia.

Article XI provides that the borders of the principality, according to its ancient rights, are those described with the Dniester River, Camenețu, Bender, with all of Budjak, Danube, Muntenia, the Grand Duchy of Transylvania and Poland.

According to Articles XII to XV, Russian protection over Moldavia is to be maintained after the conclusion of the peace in the sense that Peter is not to leave Moldavia under the domination of the Gate.

Articles XVI and XVII contain the oaths of Peter I and Dimitrie Cantemir.

== Links ==
- Enciclopedia României — Tratatul de la Lutsk (in Romanian)
