= Russo-Turkish War (1686–1700) =

Third conflict of the Russo-Turkish wars

- Part of Great Turkish War and series of Russo-Turkish wars
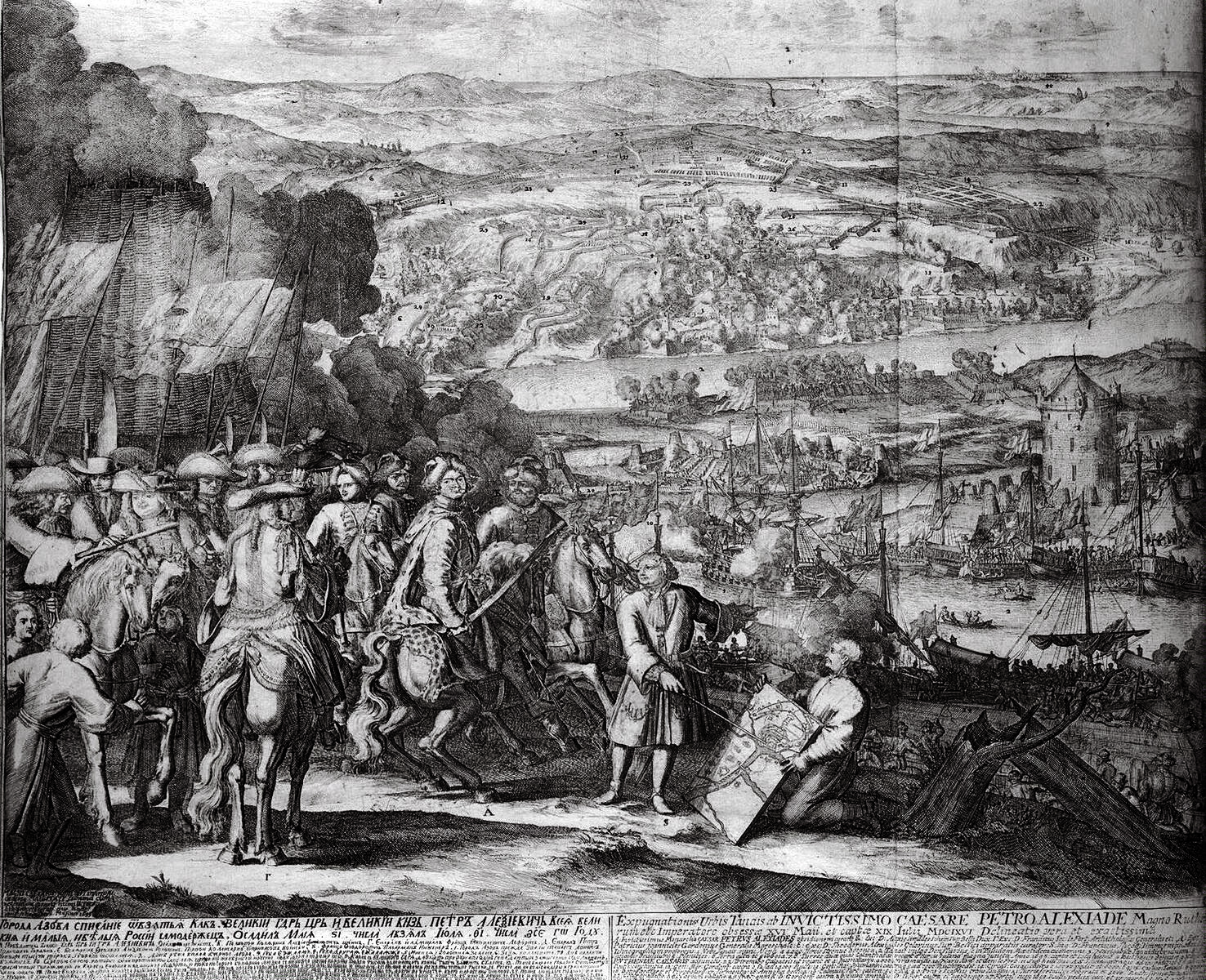
- Capture of Azov by Russian emperor Peter the Great (on horseback)
Date	1686 – 13 July 1700 (14 years)
Location	Crimea, Azov
Result	Russian victory
Territorial changes	Russia gains possession of Azov, fortress of Taganrog, Pavlovsk and Mius

Belligerents
Tsardom of Russia; Holy Roman Empire (Polish–Lithuanian Commonwealth) Poland–Lithuania; Republic of Venice; Cossack Hetmanate	Ottoman Empire; Crimean Khanate

Commanders and leaders
Peter the Great; Vasily Vasilyevich Golitsyn	(Ottoman Empire) Elmas Mehmed Pasha (Ottoman Empire) Amcazade Köprülü Hüseyin Pasha; Selim I Giray

Strength
(Tsardom of Russia) 162,902 (1687)	Unknown

Casualties and losses
90,000+ dead 1687–1689: c. 60,000; 1695–1696: 30,000+	Unknown

The Russo-Turkish War of 1686–1700 was part of the joint European effort to confront the Ottoman Empire. The larger European conflict was known as the Great Turkish War.

The Russo-Turkish War began after the Tsardom of Russia joined the European anti-Turkish coalition (Habsburg monarchy, Poland–Lithuania, Venice) in 1686, after Poland-Lithuania agreed to recognize Russian incorporation of Kiev and the left bank of Ukraine.

== War ==
During the war, the Russian army organized the Crimean campaigns of 1687 and 1689 both which ended in Russian defeats. Despite these setbacks, Russia launched the Azov campaigns in 1695 and 1696, and after raising the siege in 1695 successfully occupied Azov in 1696.

== Peace treaty ==
In light of preparations for the war against the Swedish Empire, Russian Tsar Peter the Great signed the Treaty of Karlowitz with the Ottoman Empire in 1699. The subsequent Treaty of Constantinople in 1700, ceded Azov, the Taganrog fortress, Pavlovsk and Mius to Russia, freed Russia from tribute payments and established a Russian ambassador in Constantinople, and secured the return of all prisoners of war. The Tsar also affirmed that his subordinates, the Cossacks, would not attack the Ottomans, while the Sultan affirmed his subordinates, the Crimean Tatars, would not attack the Russians. Russia benefited from the peace treaty, but it did not correspond to the original plans, because until the summer of 1695 Peter the Great strongly hoped to take the Crimea, however the diplomatic collapse of the Holy League prevented this and the Russians limited themselves to the Azov region, which partially satisfied their demands.

== Sources ==
- Bideleux, Robert; Jeffries, Ian (1998). A History of Eastern Europe: Crisis and Change. Routledge.
- Davies, Brian (2007). Warfare, State and Society on the Black Sea Steppe, 1500–1700. Routledge.
- Fuller, William C. (1992). Strategy and Power in Russia 1600-1914. MacMillan Inc.
- Hughes, Lindsey (1990). Sophia, Regent of Russia: 1657 - 1704. Yale University Press.
- Mikaberidze, Alexander (2011). "Treaty of Constantinople (1700)". In Mikaberidze, Alexander (ed.). Conflict and Conquest in the Islamic World: A Historical Encyclopedia. Vol. 1. ABC-CLIO.
- Shapira, Dan D.Y. (2011). "The Crimean Tatars and the Austro-Ottoman Wars". In Ingrao, Charles W.; Samardžić, Nikola; Pesalj, Jovan (eds.). The Peace of Passarowitz, 1718. Purdue University Press.
- Torke, Hans-Joachim (2002). "From Muscovy toward St Petersburg, 1598-1689". In Freeze, Gregory (ed.). Russia: A History (2nd ed.). Oxford University Press.
- Gus'kov, Andrei; Kochegarov, Kiril; Shamin, Stepan (2022). Русско-Турецкая война 1686-1700 [The Russo-Turkish War of 1686-1700] (PDF). Moscow: Русское слово. ISBN 978-5-533-02732-8.
