= Battle of Wesenberg (1704) =

1704 battle during Great Northern War

- Part of the Great Northern War
Date	15 June 1704 (O.S.); 16 June 1704 (Swedish calendar); 26 June 1704 (N.S.)
Location	Rakvere, Estonia 59°21′N 26°21′E
Result	Russian victory

Belligerents
(Sweden) Swedish Empire	Tsardom of Russia

Commanders and leaders
(Sweden) Wolmar Anton von Schlippenbach	(Russia) Carl Ewald von Rönne

Strength
1,400 men	8,000 men

Casualties and losses
400 killed, 600 captured	Unknown

The Battle of Wesenberg took place on 26 June 1704 close to Rakvere (Wesenberg) during the Great Northern War. The Swedish cavalry force of 1,400 men under the command of Wolmar Anton von Schlippenbach retreated before Carl Ewald von Rönnes larger force. However, the Swedes were caught at Wesenberg and after a valiant defense they had been close to annihilated with only 400 managing to escape towards Reval the rest was either killed or captured. The Russian losses are unknown.
