= Baltadji =

Palace guards in the Ottoman Empire

The baltacı or baltadji (plural baltacılar, "axemen") corps was a class of palace guards in the Ottoman Empire from the 15th to the early 19th centuries.

== History ==
Also known by the equivalent Persian title tabardar, the baltadji corps dates to the early days of the Ottoman Empire: recruited from the devshirme, they served as sappers and pioneers of the Ottoman army. Already in the early 15th century, however, a number were posted as guards in the Sultan's palace at Edirne. After the Fall of Constantinople and the establishment of various palaces in the new capital, separate companies of baltadjis were created for service in each palace: the Old Palace or Eski Saray, the New Palace or Topkapi Palace, the Galata Palace, and the Palace of Ibrahim Pasha.

== Tasks ==
Since the Topkapı Palace was the principal imperial residence, the men of its baltadji company held special status: while the men of the other companies were enrolled, after a period of service, in the Janissary infantry regiments, the men of the Topkapı Palace had the privilege of being enrolled in the sipahi and silahdar cavalry regiments. The Topkapı baltadjis were commanded by a kahya or kethüda, who was under the authority of the Sultan's principal page, the Silahdar Agha. The company was also responsible for supplying firewood to the Imperial Harem. In order to avoid inadvertently seeing the harem's ladies, the baltacıs were outfitted with special blinkers of cloth or lace and jackets with very high collars, whence they were commonly known as the "blinkered axemen" (zülüflü baltacılar). In addition, twelve subalterns (kalfas) of the Topkapı Palace company, chosen for their literacy, fulfilled ceremonial duties: they brought the Sultan's throne during his enthronement ceremony and on other festivals, they guarded the sacred standard of the Prophet on campaign while reciting verses from the Quran, guarding the belongings of the harem ladies when the court moved out of the Topkapı during the summer, and, after the 17th century, with presenting the preachers at the Sultan Ahmed Mosque with sharbat, rosewater and incense on the Prophet's Birthday. Further baltadjis of the Topkapı company were also attached to the chief palace officers, while two kalfas of the company served as the head cook and deputy head cook of the imperial kitchen.

The company guarding the Old Palace, which following the construction of the Topkapı was relegated to a residence of the sultans' mothers, was originally responsible to the Kapi Agha, but after the 17th century to the Kizlar Agha. The latter often used educated members of the Old Palace baltadji company as personal secretaries or as clerks in the administration of the pious endowments of the Holy Cities. Other men of this company were appointed as chief coffee-makers (kahvedji bashi) to the valide sultanas and various princesses.

== Devshirme system and Baltadji ==
By the middle of the 17th century, the baltadji companies were no longer drawn from the devshirme recruits (acemi oghlans), but chiefly from Anatolian Muslims and, occasionally, relatives of palace servants. In 1675, the palaces of Galata and of Ibrahim Pasha were closed down, and their baltadji companies were abolished. Sultan Mustafa III (reigned 1757–1774) abolished the Topkapı company as well, but it was restored by his successor, Abdülhamid I (r. 1774–1789), and survived until the entire palace was reorganized during the reforms of Sultan Mahmud II (r. 1808–1839).

Several members of the corps rose to become Grand Viziers, such as Baltacı Mehmet Pasha and Nevşehirli Damat Ibrahim Pasha.

== Sources ==
- Bowen, Harold (1960). "Balṭad̲j̲i̊". In Gibb, H. A. R.; Kramers, J. H.; Lévi-Provençal, E.; Schacht, J.; Lewis, B. & Pellat, Ch. (eds.). The Encyclopaedia of Islam, Second Edition. Volume I: A–B. Leiden: E. J. Brill. pp. 1003–1004. OCLC 495469456.
