= Azov campaigns (1695–1696) =

Russian military campaigns during the Russo-Turkish War of 1686–1700

- Part of Russo-Turkish War (1686–1700)
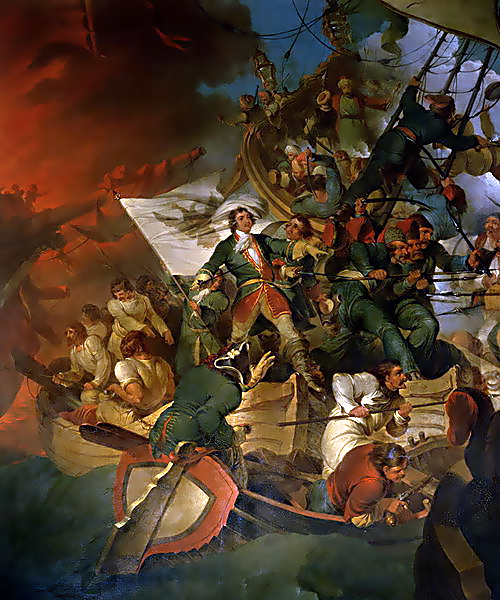
- Capture of Azov by Robert Ker Porter
Date	1695–1696
Location	Azov
Result	Russian victory
Territorial changes	Russia captures Azov, Taganrog and a few more fortresses

Belligerents
Tsardom of Russia: Don Cossacks; Cossack Hetmanate; (Kalmyk Khanate) Kalmyk cavalry	Ottoman Empire; Crimean Khanate

Commanders and leaders
(Tsardom of Russia) Peter the Great	Unknown

Strength
(Tsardom of Russia) 70,000–75,000 soldiers and numerous ships	(Ottoman Empire) 7,000 Janissaries (Azov garrison)

Casualties and losses
(Tsardom of Russia) Heavy	(Ottoman Empire) Heavy

The Azov campaigns of 1695–1696 (Russian: Азо́вские похо́ды, romanized: Azovskiye Pokhody) were two Russian military campaigns during the Russo-Turkish War of 1686–1700, led by Peter the Great and aimed at capturing the Turkish fortress of Azov (garrison – 7,000 men) with the aim of controlling the southern mouth of the Don River gaining access to the Sea of Azov and entrance to the Black Sea. Despite stubborn resistance and heavy casualties, the Russians under General Sheremetev after a failed siege in 1695 managed to capture the fort, accompanied by a naval force, in July 1696, marking the first major Russian victory against the Turks.

== First Azov campaign ==
The first Azov campaign began in the spring of 1695. Peter the Great ordered his army (31,000 men and 170 guns) to advance towards Azov. The army comprised crack regiments and the Don Cossacks and was divided into three units under the command of Franz Lefort, Patrick Gordon and Avtonom Golovin. Supplies were shipped down the Don from Voronezh. In 1693 the Ottoman garrison of the fortress was 3,656, of whom 2,272 were Janissaries. Between June 27 and July 5 the Russians blocked Azov from land but could not control the river and prevent resupply. After two unsuccessful attacks on August 5 and September 25, the siege was lifted on October 1.

Another Russian army (120,000 men, mostly cavalry, Streltsy, Ukrainian Cossacks and Kalmyks) under the command of Boris Sheremetev set out for the lower reaches of the Dnieper to take the Ottoman forts there. The main fort at Gazi-Kerman was taken when its powder magazine blew up, as well as Islam-Kerman, Tagan and Tavan, but the Russians were not able to hold the area and withdrew most of their forces. By the Treaty of Constantinople (1700) the remaining Russians were withdrawn and the lower Dnieper was declared a demilitarized zone.

== Second Azov campaign ==
At the end of 1695, the Russians began preparing for the second Azov campaign. By the spring of 1696 they had built a fleet of ships at Voronezh with a view to blocking Turkish reinforcement of the garrison at Azov. The cavalry under the command of Sheremetev (up to 70,000 men) was once again sent to the lower reaches of the Dnieper. From April 23–26 the main forces (75,000 men) under the command of Aleksei Shein started to advance towards Azov by land and water (the rivers of Voronezh and Don). Peter I and his galley fleet left for Azov on May 3. On May 27 the Russian fleet (two ships-of-the-line, four fire ships, 23 galleys and miscellaneous vessels, built at Voronezh and nearby locations) under the command of Lefort reached the sea and blocked Azov. On June 14 the Turkish fleet (23 ships with 4,000 men) appeared at the mouth of the Don. However, it left after having lost two ships in combat. The Russian forces conducted a massive bombardment from land and sea, and Ukrainian and Don Cossacks seized the external rampart of the fortress on July 17. The Azov garrison surrendered on July 19.

== Aftermath ==
The Azov campaigns demonstrated the significance of having a fleet and marked the beginning of Russia's becoming a maritime power. Russia's success at Azov strengthened its positions during the Karlowitz Congress of 1698–1699 and favored the signing of the Treaty of Constantinople in 1700. As Azov's harbor was not convenient for the military fleet, the Tsar selected another more appropriate site on July 27, 1696, on the cape Tagan-Rog (Taganrog). On September 12, 1698, Taganrog was founded there, which became the first military base of the Russian Navy.

Although the campaign was a success, it was evident to Peter I of Russia that he achieved only partial results, since his fleet was bottled up in the Sea of Azov due to Crimean and Ottoman control of the Strait of Kerch. A regular navy and specialists who could build and navigate military ships were necessary for resisting the Ottoman attacks. On October 20, 1696, the Boyar Duma decreed the creation of the regular Imperial Russian Navy; this date is considered to be the birthdate of the Russian Navy. The first shipbuilding program consisted of 52 vessels.

In 1697, a Russian ambassador present at the Safavid court raised an issue by handing over a note which stipulated that "Lezgi, Circassian, and other Caucasian tribesmen, ostensibly Persian subjects", had provided assistance to the Ottomans during the Azov campaigns. The report also included the request to declare war on the Ottomans, as well as to repay some 300,000 tomans to the Russians, which the report asserted were owed to the Tsar "since the days of shah Safi" (r. 1629–1642).

Russia was forced to give up its territorial gains fourteen years later in 1711 following Ottoman successes in the Pruth River Campaign in the midst of the Great Northern War. Russia retook the region in the Russo-Turkish War of 1735–1739 (further confirmed after the Russo-Turkish War of 1768–1774) and it remains part of Rostov Oblast today.
