= Trukhnovo =

Trukhnovo Трухново
- Village
- Location within Vologda Oblast Location within Russia
- Coordinates: 59°02′N 35°21′E
- Country: Russia
- Region: Vologda Oblast
- District: Chagodoshchensky District
- Time zone: UTC+3:00

Trukhnovo (Russian: Трухново) is a rural locality (a village) in Belokrestskoye Rural Settlement, Chagodoshchensky District, Vologda Oblast, Russia. The population was 2 as of 2002.

== Geography ==
Trukhnovo is located 22 km (14 mi) south of Chagoda (the district's administrative centre) by road. Kostyleva Gora is the nearest rural locality.
