= Treaty of Adrianople (1713) =

1713 treaty between Russia and the Ottomans

The Treaty of Adrianople, also called the Treaty of Edirne, was signed on 24 June 1713 between the Ottoman Empire and the Tsardom of Russia and confirmed the Treaty of the Pruth of 1711, which had ended the Pruth River Campaign (1710–1711).

The Treaty of Pruth, signed by Baltacı Mehmet Pasha, was at first received well in Constantinople, but the dissatisfied pro-war party, supported by King Charles XII of Sweden, who had taken refuge in the Ottoman Empire since 1709, turned public opinion against Baltacı Mehmet Pasha, who was finally relieved from his office.

Sultan Ahmed III failed to resume the war with Russia. He finally became annoyed by the pro-war party and decided to send the troublesome Swedish king back to his homeland, which removed all obstacles for a final peace settlement with Russia. The Treaty of Adrianople would keep the peace for 25 years.
