= Baltacı Mehmet Pasha =

Grand Vizier of the Ottoman Empire in 1704–6 and 1710–11

Pakçemüezzin Baltacı Mehmet Pasha
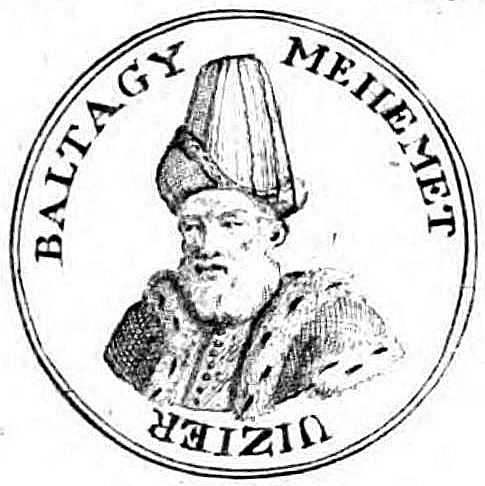

Grand Vizier of the Ottoman Empire
- In office 18 August 1710 – 20 November 1711
- Monarch: Ahmet III
- Preceded by: Köprülü Numan Pasha
- Succeeded by: Ağa Yusuf Pasha

Grand Vizier of the Ottoman Empire
- In office 25 December 1704 – 3 May 1706
- Monarch: Ahmet III
- Preceded by: Kalaylıkoz Hacı Ahmed Pasha
- Succeeded by: Çorlulu Damat Ali Pasha

Personal details
- Born: 1652 Osmancık, Çorum, Ottoman Empire
- Died: July 1712 (aged 59–60) Lemnos, Ottoman Empire

Military service
- Allegiance: Ottoman Empire
- Branch/service: Ottoman Navy (1704); Ottoman Army
- Years of service: 1704–06, 1710–12
- Rank: Kapudan Pasha (1704); Serdar (Commander-in-Chief; 1710–12)
- Battles/wars: Pruth River Campaign

Baltacı Mehmet Pasha (also called Pakçemüezzin Baltacı Mehmet Pasha, sometimes known just as Baltacı or Baltadji; 1662, Osmancık – July 1712, Lemnos) was an Ottoman statesman who served as grand vizier of the Ottoman Empire, first from 1704 to 1706 and again in 1710 to 1711, and as Kapudan Pasha (grand admiral of the Ottoman Navy) in 1704.

== Early years ==
Mehmet was born in Osmancık, near Çorum (modern Turkey). He was of Turkish origin. He travelled to North Africa, which was then Ottoman territory. He then came to Constantinople, the capital of the empire, where he found a job as a baltacı (palace employee) in the palace of the sultan which earned him the epithet Baltacı. He also worked as a secretary and muezzin (person who calls others to prayer in Islamic tradition) and earned the nickname pakçemuezzin. Soon, he was promoted to be the chief stableman (imrahor) and then Grand Admiral (Kapudan Pasha) in 1704. On 25 December 1704, he became the grand vizier.

== First term as Grand Vizier and governor ==
There are no remarkable feats in his first term as Grand Vizier, and in 1706 he was dismissed. In just four years, he was appointed three times to various remote provinces, namely Erzurum, the island Chios (Turkish: Sakız), and Aleppo (Turkish: Halep) as a governor (presently, Erzurum is in Turkey, Chios in Greece, and Aleppo is in Syria). On 18 August 1710, he began his second term as Grand Vizier.

== Second term as Grand Vizier ==
His second term is quite well known. In 1709, during the Great Northern War, Charles XII of Sweden had been defeated by the Russians in the battle of Poltava and took refuge in Ottoman territory, with Peter I of Russia in pursuit. The Ottoman Empire declared war on Russia. Baltacı Mehmet was named the commander (serdar) of the army. He was able to encircle the Russian army near the Pruth River (now forming the border line between Romania and Moldova), forcing Peter to sue for peace. The Treaty of Pruth stipulated the return of the fortress Azov, which had been annexed by Russia by the Treaty of Karlowitz, to the Ottomans; several Russian fortresses were to be demolished; Peter I promised not to interfere into the affairs of the Polish–Lithuanian Commonwealth and Charles XII was given a free passage to his country.

== From Constantinople to Lemnos ==
Although the initial reaction of Sultan Ahmed III to the treaty was satisfactory, Baltacı Mehmet Pasha's political rivals, as well as Charles XII and Devlet II Giray, the vassal Crimean khan, were dissatisfied with the terms. He was accused of accepting the aforementioned bribe from Peter I of Russia (through Catherine) and was dismissed from his post on 20 November 1711. Baltacı was exiled to the modern-day Greek islands of Lesbos (Midilli) and later Lemnos (Limni), where he died the next year in July 1712.

== Trivia ==
Some contemporaries, such as Voltaire in his book Peter the Great, reported that Mehmet Pasha was involved in a matter with future-Empress Catherine I of Russia, then the consort of Peter. Surrounded by overwhelming numbers of Turkish troops, Catherine suggested before surrendering, that her jewels and those of the other women be used in an effort to bribe Baltacı Mehmet Pasha into allowing a retreat. Mehmet allowed the retreat, whether motivated by the bribe or considerations of trade and diplomacy.

The story of Mehmet Pasha's relationship with Catherine I and his subsequent punishment by exile has been the subject of several works of literature in both Turkey and Russia, including the 1961 play Lütfen Dokunmayın by Turkish playwright Haldun Taner and the book Baltacı ile Katerina ("Baltacı and Catherine") by Murat Sertoğlu.

Political offices
Preceded by Kalaylıkoz Hacı Ahmed Pasha	Grand Vizier of the Ottoman Empire; 25 December 1704 – 3 May 1706	Succeeded by Çorlulu Damat Ali Pasha
Preceded by Köprülü Numan Pasha	Grand Vizier of the Ottoman Empire; 18 August 1710 – 20 November 1711	Succeeded by Ağa Yusuf Pasha
