= Treaty of the Pruth =

1711 treaty between Russia and the Ottomans

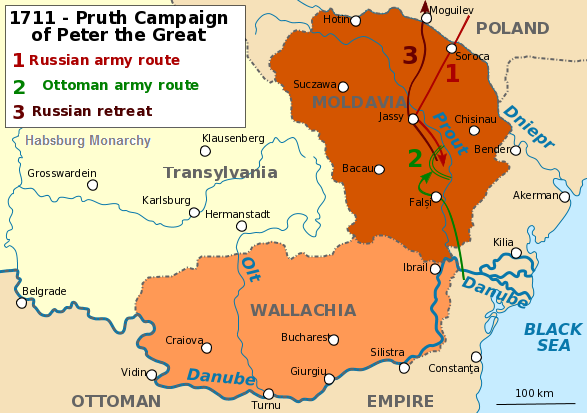
- Drafted: 21 July 1711
- Signed: 23 July 1711
- Location: Prut River, mostly within Moldavia
- Negotiators: Peter P. Shafirov (Russian Tsardom); Baltacı Mehmet Pasha (Ottoman Empire)
- Parties: Ottoman Empire (Tsardom of Russia) Russian Tsardom

The Treaty of the Pruth (Note: Sometimes also known as the Treaty of the Prut; Turkish: Prut Antlaşması; Russian: Прутский мирный договор) was signed on the banks of the river Prut between the Ottoman Empire and the Tsardom of Russia on 23 July 1711 ending the Russo-Turkish War of 1710–1713 with the assistance of Peter Shafirov. The treaty was a political victory for the Ottoman Empire.

The Treaty stipulated the return of Azov Fortress to the Ottomans, Taganrog and several Russian fortresses were to be demolished, and the Tsar pledged to stop interfering in the affairs of the Polish–Lithuanian Commonwealth, which the Russians increasingly saw as under their sphere of influence. The treaty also stipulated the safe return of King Charles XII to Sweden.

== Background ==
The indirect causes of the war can be attributed to the aggressive expansion of the Swedish Empire throughout the 16th and 17th centuries. Sweden’s aggressive expansion in Scandinavia forced a coalition of Eastern European nations to form and contain them, including the Tsardom of Russia. After defeat at the Battle of Narva in 1700, Russia was invaded by King Charles XII as part of the Great Northern War. The invasion of Russia was unsuccessful, and many of Charles’ army died of disease and attrition. In addition, Peter the Great's reign consisted of a period of increasing western influence and orientation, characterised by establishing the capital of Russia as Saint Petersburg in 1703, opening direct naval links to the west.

The Pruth River Campaign erupted as a direct result of the defeat of King Charles XII at the Battle of Poltava in the summer of 1709 and his retreat into the Ottoman Empire. In February 1710, General Stanislaw Poniatowski, father of the last Polish King, was sent to Constantinople by King Charles XII as his envoy after it became clear to the monarch that he would have no safe passage through Poland back to Sweden to continue the Great Northern War. In his role as envoy, the General was to accomplish the following tasks: (i) to work for the deposition of the Grand Vizier Tchorlulu Ali Pasha, who was considered friendly to the Russians, (ii) to prepare the foundations of a Turkish-Swedish alliance (directed against Russia), (iii) to bring Turkey into a war against Russia; (iv) to prevent the recognition of Augustus II as King of Poland by the Sublime Porte; (v) to secure the 'escort' for the Swedish King in conformity with the former promises of Sultan Ahemet III and (vi) to arrange a money loan from the Sublime Porte.

Despite repetitive calls from Russia to extradite King Charles, the Ottoman Court refused. These repetitive calls and aggressive diplomacy on behalf of King Charles XII led the Ottomans to declare war on Russia on 20 November 1710. Concurrently, Russia and Moldavia (now Romania) signed an agreement which guaranteed Russian military access through Moldavia and promised troops and logistics.

== Pruth River Campaign ==
Contemporary drawing of the Prut River Campaign

A Russian army of 80,000 men advanced down the Pruth River in the summer of 1711, utilising Moldavian support and military access. The army was led by Peter the Great and Boris Sheremetev and attempted to invade Ottoman occupied Moldavia with the support of exiled ruler (Voivode) of Moldavia Dimitrie Cantemir. The campaign was ill-prepared and lacked proper planning and logistic support, and although the Russian army was large and well equipped, it was outmanoeuvred by a 70,000 strong Ottoman army under the command of Grand Vizier Baltacı Mehmet Pasha.

The decisive moment of the campaign was the four-day Battle of Stănilești, which began on 18 July 1711. The two armies engaged on the floodplains of the Pruth River in an unprepared battle. The battle was so unexpected that General Stanislaw Poniatowski hurriedly wrote to King Charles XII during the engagement on small pieces of paper and dated it 1710 rather than 1711. His letters were delivered to the Swedish monarch by Captain Busquet and the King tried in vain to make it to the negotiations, favouring a renewed Ottoman campaign to capture Kiev and Ukraine. During the engagement, Ottoman forces surrounded and cut off the large Russian army, leading to their eventual surrender on 22 July.

== Negotiations ==
The Russian army was fully surrounded by 22 July, leading Peter to open peace negotiations with Grand Vizier Baltaci Mehmet Pasha. The situation that arose gave the Ottomans a dominant negotiating position, which was further aggravated by the calls for harsher terms by General Stanisław Poniatowski – the emissary of King Charles XII.

Despite the Russian army being in a sorry state — with Peter I himself facing death or captivity — the peace imposed on the Russians by the Ottomans was very light, in large part due to a huge bribe given by the Russians. Baltaci managed to secure the entirety of the Russian treasury and all their precious stones, thousands of horses and artillery and a night spent by the Tsar's consort, Catherine, at Baltaci's tent.

Although Field Marshal Boris Sheremetev was nominally in charge of the Russian forces, Peter the Great was the supreme military commander, and ordered his Vice Chancellor, Baron Peter P. Shafirov to negotiate peace with the Turks. In his diploma of authorisation is written: "Whatever Our Vice-Chancellor will generate and decide, that will be strong and indisputable." In his instruction, Peter the Great emphasised his willingness to cede to the Sublime Porte the territories and fortresses won in the Azov Campaigns of 1695–1696 and confirmed by the Treaty of Constantinople in 1700. Peter the Great was also willing to cede to the Swedes Livonia, Pskov, and other provinces, and to recognise Stanisław Leszczyński as King of Poland.

There were several major influences during the peace negotiations. The Crimean Khan Devlet II Giray argued for harsher terms of surrender on the surrounded Russian army. His reasons for harsher terms were motivated by the increasing threat a united and Imperial Russia posed on the Crimean Khanate and continued Russian expansion south towards the Caucasus mountain range. Together with the exiled King Charles XII of Sweden, he desired granting a full independence to Ukraine under the rule of Philip (Pylyp) Orlyk (who drafted the first Ukrainian Constitution in 1710) and granted protection to Cossacks. This part of the agreement Petr refused to fulfil once he was safe. As well as the return of King Charles to Sweden to continue the Great Northern War.

The Ottomans also demanded the return of Dimitrie Cantemir, the exiled Voivode of Moldavia. Although Peter the Great agreed to all other demands, he refused to return Cantemir, on the basis that Cantemir had fled his camp.

Notably, Charles was not present in the Ottoman camp, despite being one of the principal reasons why the two empires were at war. Instead, Charles sent General Stanislaw Poniatowski as the emissary of both King Charles of Sweden and then former King Stanisław Leszczyński of Poland, who had been exiled after the defeat of Charles at the Battle of Poltava. Poniatowski sent several letters from the Ottoman camp back to Charles who was at this point residing in Bender with a significant retinue.

== Stipulations ==
The treaty primarily stipulated the return of the strategic fortress of Azov to the Ottoman Empire. The fortress was taken from the Ottomans in 1700 through the signing of the Treaty of Constantinople. Additionally, the treaty stipulated the destruction of several key Russian fortresses, listed as follows:

- Razed fortresses: Taganrog Fortress, Kodak Fortress (Stari Kodaky, Dnipro), Novobogoroditskaya Fortress (Samar, Dnipro) as well as Kamenny Zaton (Rocky Backwater, today Kamianka-Dniprovska)
- Surrendered fortress: Azov Fortress

The Russians also lost the right to a permanent ambassador in the Ottoman Porte. Upon the signing of the Peace Treaty, Peter P. Shafirov and M.M. Sheremetev (the son of the Field Marshall General), were taken to Constantinople, where they were to remain until the full implementation by Russia of its obligations. Both Peter P. Shafirov and M.M Sheremetev hoped to leave the Ottoman Empire following the letters of ratification, but were held against their will by the Turks until the border commission had been completed. The two remained in Istanbul for several years, and acted as diplomats and negotiators on behalf of Peter the Great. They were both imprisoned for as long as 6 months in the Yedikule prison as hostages and were eager to return home, using every opportunity available to speak with both Ottoman and Russian diplomats to hurry the peace process.

Moreover, terms of the treaty included an end to Russian political influence in the Polish – Lithuanian Commonwealth, which the Russians increasingly saw within their own sphere of influence.

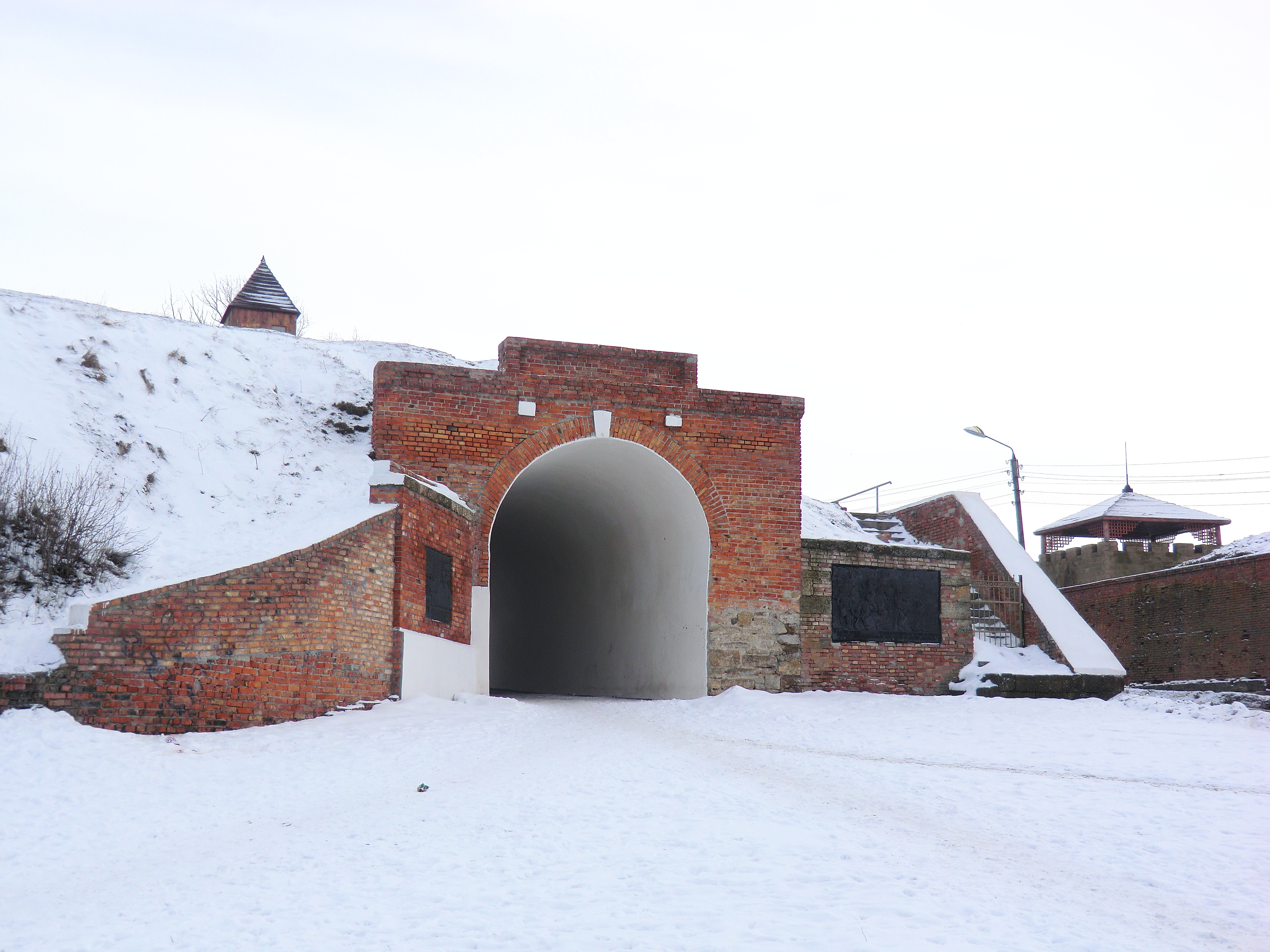
Azov Alexeyevsky Gate

== Reactions ==
Within the Ottoman Empire, the treaty was received relatively positively. A protracted war with Russia was not considered favourable and would have been a large scale and relatively unsustainable conflict. The influence of Swedish King Charles XII was significant however and he continued to live in the Ottoman court. Moreover, he called for another war to reclaim land lost to Russia in the Great Northern War and harsher treaty stipulations on Peter the Great. Particularly, he sent General Stanislaw Poniatowski with the Ottoman forces in an attempt to influence the eventual treaty. He was however, sent away from the negotiations for his aggressive and war mongering negotiating tactics. After the General was sent away, he was ordered to write a strong letter of complaint to the Swedish ambassador to the Sultan, Thomas Funck, dated 29 August 1711. Increasing tensions between the Grand Vizier Baltaci Mehmet Pasha and King Charles XII forced the monarch to command another letter of complaint dated 4 October 1711. This letter detailed the true nature of the peace terms to the Sultan for the first time, and combined with complaints from Devlet II Giray to the Sublime Porte regarding the Grand Vizier's weak negotiating and his ill treatment of the Crimean Khan saw the downfall of Baltaci Mehmet Pasha and the return of open hostility with the Russian Tsardom.

Whilst the Treaty ended the immediate military conflict, the larger geopolitical conflict was still very active. The expansion of Russia into the Caucasus and Ukraine regions threatened Ottoman control in these areas. Over the next two years, several wars were declared. On 9 December 1711, a new conflict was declared, although there was no military action and the conflict was resolved through the Russian ambassadors in Constantinople. The Turks declared war on Russia again on 31 October 1712 and 13 April 1713 although the conflicts followed similarly to the first, and no military action was conducted. Skilled ambassadors in Constantinople avoided large scale war and the events culminated in the signing of the Treaty of Adrianople in 1713. The Treaty confirmed the stipulations agreed upon by the Treaty of the Pruth and added a special clause to delimit the borders between the two states. The Treaty of Adrianople saw the area surrounding Azov completely returned to the Turks, while Peter the Great 'took his hand away' from Ukraine and Zaporizhian Sich on the right bank of the Dnieper. Both empires were forbidden from constructing fortresses across their extensive borders. However, the issue of Russian access to the Black Sea remained a critical and longstanding issue. The border established after the work of both border commissions in 1714 was once again confirmed in the eternal Peace Treaty of Constantinople in 1724. It was only during the reign of Empress Anna Ioannovna that the issue was resolved and the borders between the two empires were finally settled.

In England, the treaty was received relatively well. The English Levant Company, which had significant vested trading interest in the east had become increasingly worried about the influence of the Russian Navy on their Eastern profits. The English ambassador Sir Robert Sutton drew the Porte's attention to a potential campaign of religious and political propaganda by Russian agents amongst Ottoman Christians to successfully convince the Sultan to not reinstate a Russian ambassador and embassy, and to instead maintain diplomats who could be imprisoned in times of war with Russia. This was a successful smear campaign that prevented Russian merchants from obtaining capitulations for merchants to trade in and make profit in Ottoman ports. This enabled the English Levant Company to retain successful trading operations.

== Bibliography ==
- Rayfield, Donald (2024). 'A Seditious and Sinister Tribe': The Crimean Tatars and Their Khanate. London: Reaktion Books. ISBN 9781789149593.
