= Army of Peter the Great =

Russian army during the reign of Peter the Great

Russian Army
- Армия Петра I (Russian)
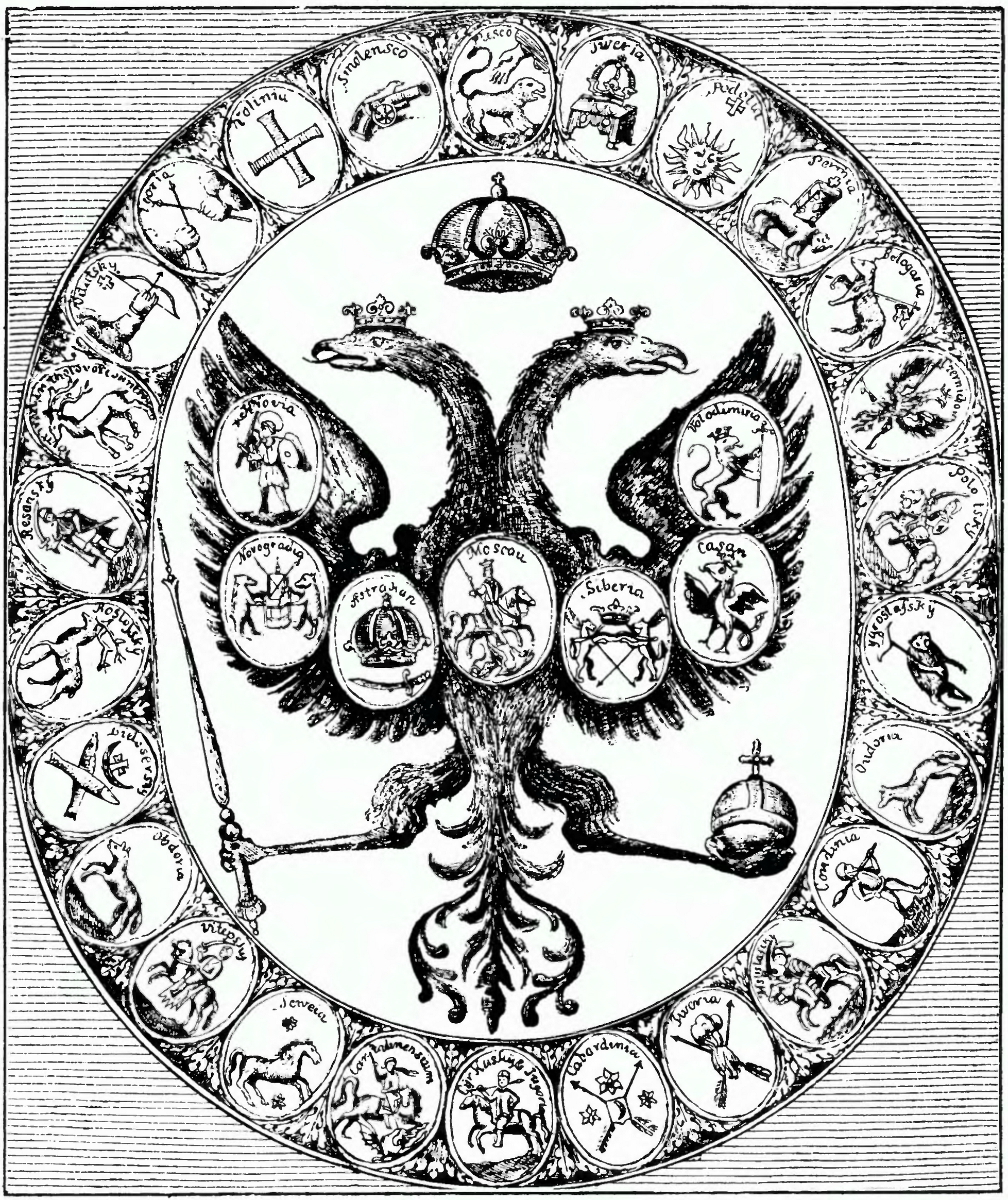
- Founded: 1682
- Disbanded: 1721
- Headquarters: Moscow

Related articles
- History: Military history of Russia

The Russian Army (Russian: Русская армия), better known as the Army of Peter the Great (Russian: Армия Петра I), was the army of the Tsardom of Russia during the reign of Peter the Great from 1682 to 1721. The army was created by the Russian Tsar Peter I on the basis of the Zheldaks (Russian: Желдаки), later called by historians, that began to appear in Russia during the reign of his father, regiments of the new (foreign) system, Streltsy army and Cossacks, taking into account the latest European achievements in the field of military art. The army was a successor to the Army of the Tsardom of Russia and the predecessor of the Imperial Russian Army.

The army replaced the irregular local troops, which were a feudal relic, and the streltsy units, which opposed Peter I during the struggle for power and were then gradually disbanded by him. The army and Imperial Russian Navy were staffed on the basis of conscription (compulsory service for nobles also remained until the mid-18th century). Later it was transformed as a result of the military reform carried out in the 1860s—1870s, during the reign of Alexander II, who, among other things, introduced universal conscription, reduced the number of the guard, army and navy in peacetime by 40% and the terms services, as well as the armed forces were equipped with the latest weapons.

== History ==
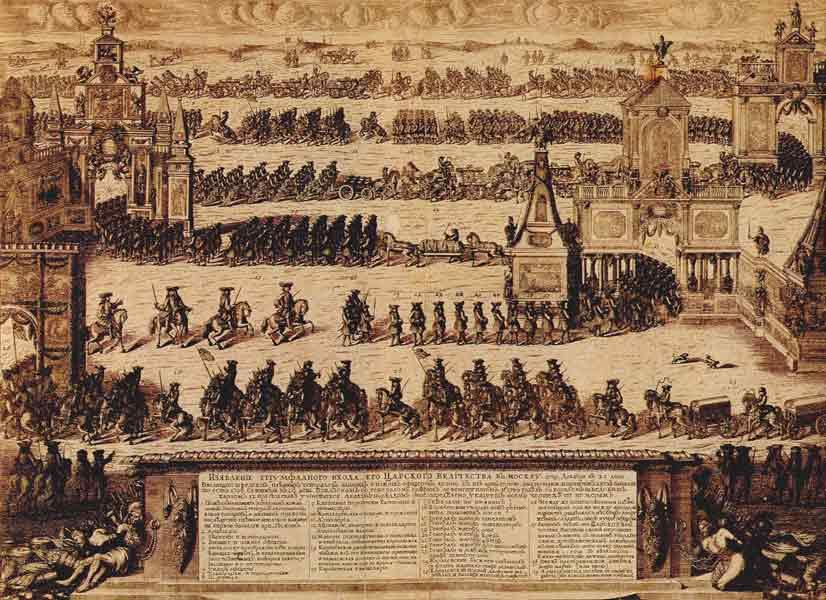
Alexey Zubov, The ceremonial entry of Russian troops into Moscow after the Poltava victory on December 21, 1709, work of 1711.

From his predecessors, Peter I inherited an army that, if not satisfying all the requirements of the military science of that time, was already adapted for further reconstruction in view of new requirements. In Moscow there were two "elected" regiments (Butyrsky and Lefortovo), which were headed by Peter's teachers in military affairs, "foreigners" P. Gordon and F. Lefort.

=== Amusement Troops ===
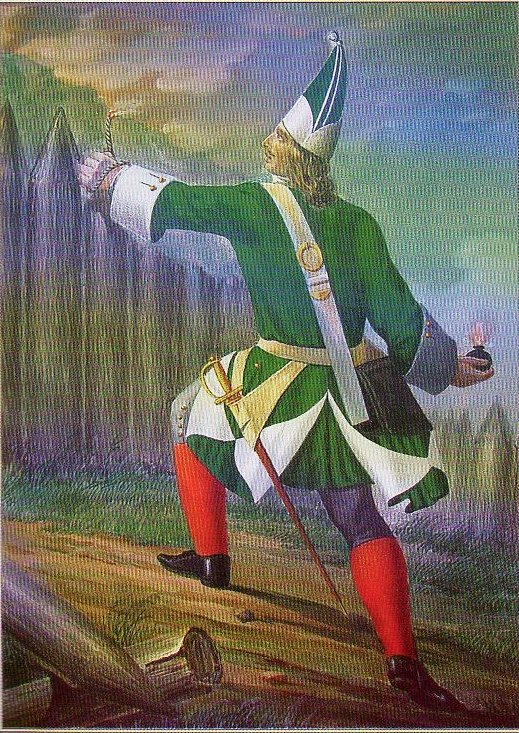
Grenadier of an infantry regiment from 1700 to 1732

In his "amusing" villages, Peter organized two new regiments – Preobrazhensky and Semyonovsky – completely according to the foreign model. By 1692, these regiments were finally trained and formed the 3rd Moscow elective regiment, led by General Avtonom Golovin, who united both "amusing" regiments under his command: Colonel J. von Mengden was put at the head of Preobrazhensky, Semyonovsky was appointed colonel I. I. Chambers.

The Kozhukhov maneuvers (1694) showed Peter the advantage of regiments of the "foreign" formation over the archers. The Azov campaigns, in which, along with the Streltsy army and irregular cavalry, four regular regiments (Preobrazhensky, Semenovsky, Lefortovo and Butyrsky regiments) participated, finally convinced Peter of the low suitability of the troops of the old organization.

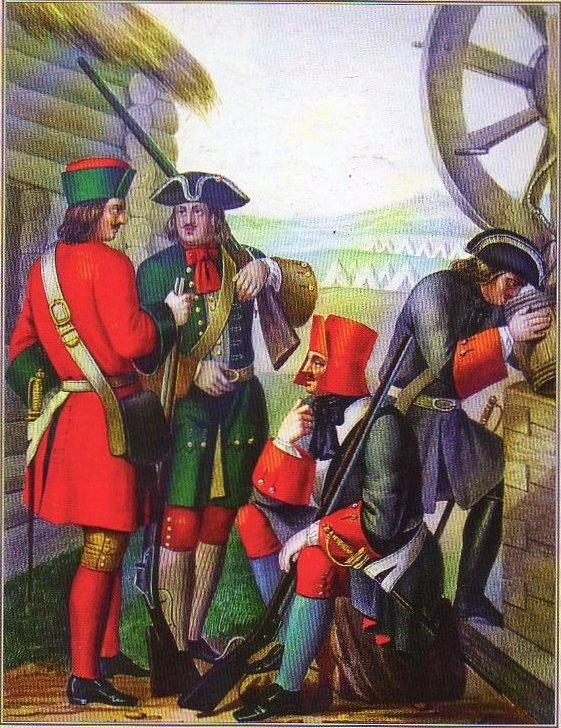
Fusiliers of infantry regiments from 1700 to 1720

In preparation for the war with Sweden, Peter formed 25 new infantry regiments and 2 cavalry – dragoons. The entire newly recruited army of 35–40,000 people was divided into three "generalships" (divisions): Avtonom Golovin, Adam Veyde and Prince Anikita Repnin.

The war was supposed to begin with the Siege of Narva, so the main attention was paid to organizing the infantry. The operations of the field army were to be supported by local cavalry (of the "new" cavalry, only two dragoon regiments managed to be formed). There was simply not enough time to create all the necessary military structures. Management, a combat support service, and a strong, well-equipped rear had yet to be created.

=== The command staff ===
By the beginning of the Northern War, Peter's teachers, Generals P. Gordon and F. Lefort, as well as Generalissimo Aleksei Shein had died, so the new army was entrusted to Fyodor Alexeyevich Golovin, who received the rank of Field Marshal. However, Peter did not dare to entrust his army to an excellent administrator, but not a military leader, in a real battle against the Swedes. On the eve of Battle of Narva, he and F.A. Golovin left the Russian army, and the main command was entrusted to the Saxon field marshal Duke de Croÿ, who arrived at the camp of the Russian Tsar in order to negotiate the sending of a Russian auxiliary corps to Riga.

The "generals" in the Battle of Narva were commanded by Avtonom Golovin, and the Novgorod governor Ivan Trubetskoy (all born in 1667) – all of them were 33 years old, and none of them had actually fought with troops before commanded, and all combat experience was limited to participation in the Azov campaigns. Tsarevich Prince Alexander of Imereti (1674–1711), the general-feldtseykhmeyster and judge of the Pushkarsky prikaz, and the commander of the guards regiments, Major General Ivan Buturlin (1661–1738), were young and inexperienced.

The company-level commanders were just as young and inexperienced: near Narva, most of the officers had essentially the same level of training as their soldiers: only a few months of drill in the new "Short Ordinary Training".

At the same time, the staff officer positions were filled by experienced military leaders who suffered the greatest losses in the first battle of the Northern War.

Peter's reforms led the Russian army to such impressive victories over the Swedish Empire as the Battle of Poltava.

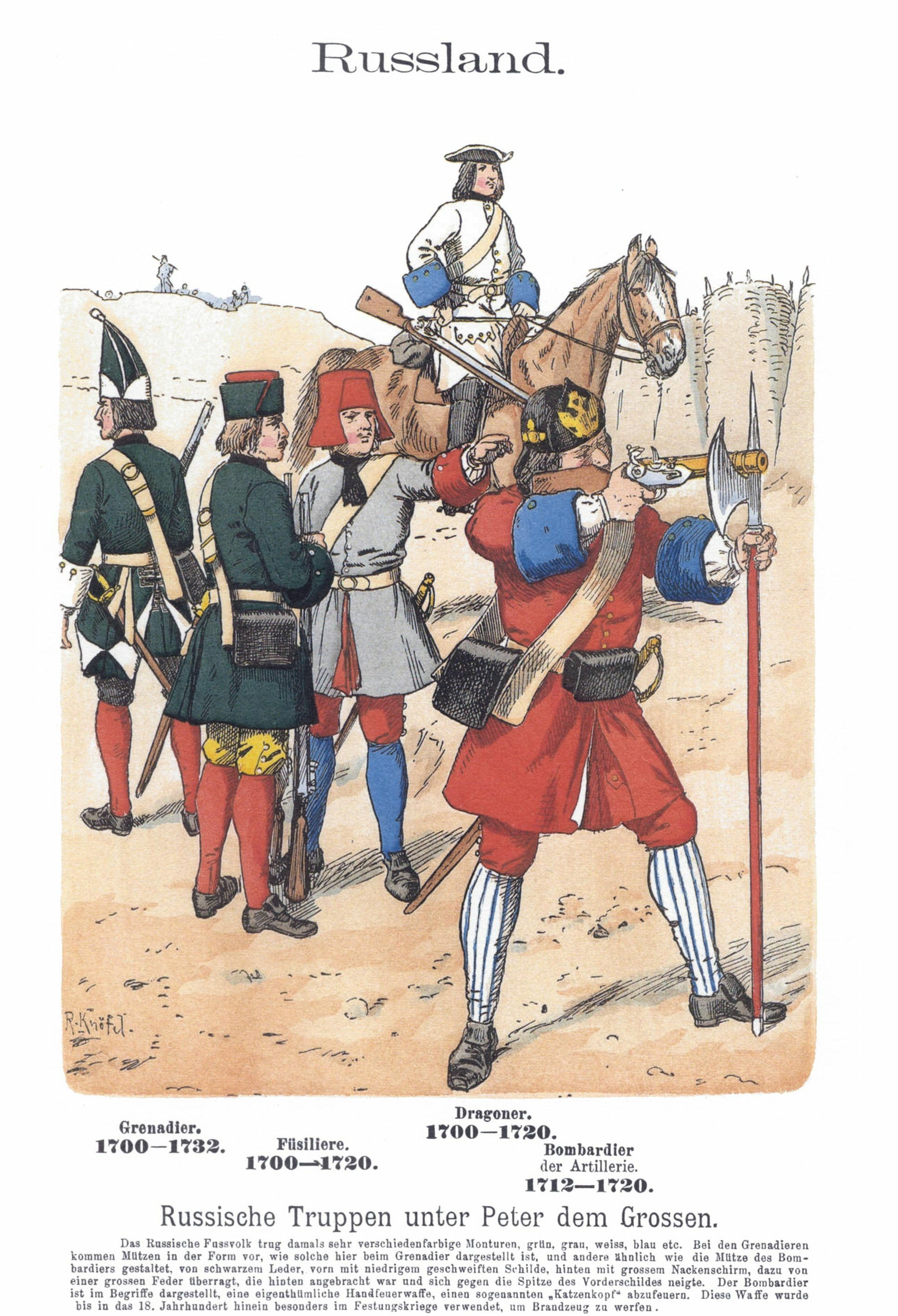
Russian troops under Peter the Great. Description (in German)

== See also ==
- Russian hussars
