= General Golovin =

General Golovin may refer to:

- Avtonom Golovin (1667–1720), Imperial Russian Army general
- Fyodor Alexeyevich Golovin (1650–1706), Imperial Russian Army general
- Nikolai Golovin (1875–1944), Imperial Russian Army general
- Yevgeny Golovin (1782–1858), Imperial Russian Army general
