= Adam Veyde =

Russian general of German origin (1667–1720)

- Адам Адамович Вейде
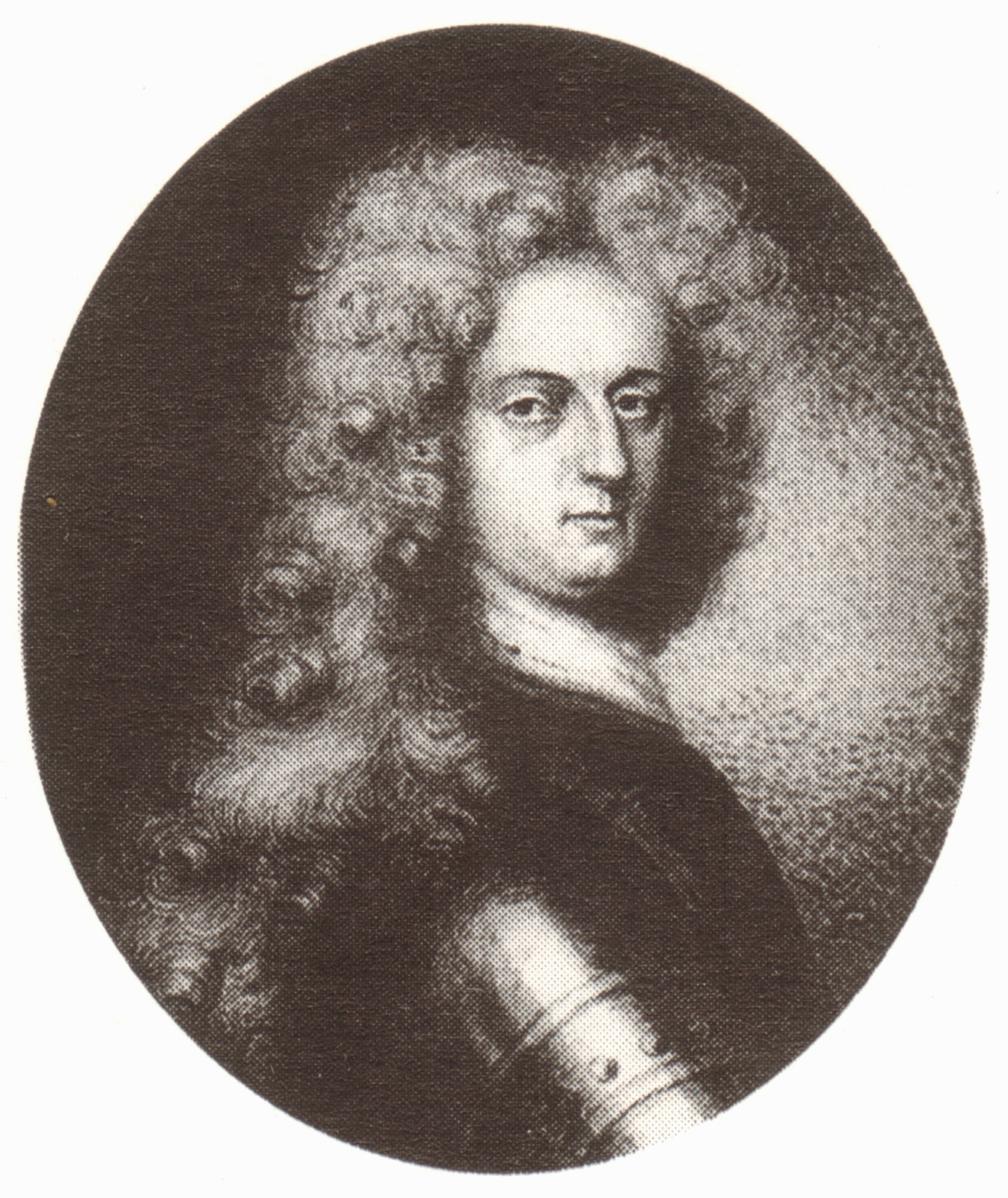
- Portrait by Elias Brenner, during Veyde's time in Swedish captivity
- Born: 1667
- Died: 26 January 1720 (aged 52–53)
- Burial place: Alexander Nevsky Lavra
- Military career
- Allegiance: Russia
- Branch: Infantry
- Rank: General
- Unit: Preobrazhensky Lifeguard regiment
- Conflicts: Azov campaigns

Adam Adamovich Veyde or Weyde (Russian: Адам Адамович Вейде; 1667 – 26 January 1720) was a Russian infantry general and a close associate of Peter the Great.

== Military career ==
Adam Veyde began his military career in the so-called poteshnye voiska. He participated in both of the Azov campaigns, being a major of Preobrazhensky Lifeguard regiment in charge of engineer works during the siege of the Azov fortress. Enjoying Peter the Great's great confidence, Adam Veyde was frequently sent abroad on different important assignments and accompanied the tsar during all of his trips. For example, Veyde was dispatched to Hungary and Saxony in 1696 to notify their leaders of the falling of Azov.

In 1698, he was sent to France and England to study military science. Upon his return, Adam Veyde presented a military charter composed by him (Russian: Воинский устав; also known as the Veyde Charter), in which he had set forth administrative and military rules for infantry regiments under formation, responsibilities of all military ranks (from private to commander-in-chief inclusively), the rules of conduct for all ranks under any circumstances, and drill procedures. Adam Veyde composed his charter under the influence of Louis XIV's legal provisions of military nature and organization of Eugene of Savoy's army, which had already earned fame by that time. The Veyde Charter formed the basis for the Peter the Great's Charter of 1716.

Upon the disbandment of the streltsy regiments, General Avtonom Golovin and Adam Veyde were ordered to form 18 infantry and 2 Dragoon regiments in Moscow in autumn 1699. Also, Veyde was put in charge of teaching the marching drill to stolniks, stryapchiys (butlers), and zhiltsys (lowest category of the service class people).

During the Great Northern War, Adam Veyde was assigned to command one of the 10-regiment divisions as part of Field Marshal Charles Eugène de Croÿ's army in 1700. After having approached Narva, Veyde's inexperienced division succumbed to the attacks of the Swedish army, albeit it managed to keep battle formation the longest among other Russian units. Adam Veyde himself was taken prisoner and sent to Stockholm, where he would remain until 1710 and then be exchanged for General Niels Jonsson Stromberg. While in captivity, Veyde observed the Swedes and the way their army was organized.

During the Russo-Turkish War of 1710–1711, Adam Veyde commanded an 8-regiment division. In 1714, he was put in charge of 7 infantry and 3 cavalry regiments and dispatched to Finland. There, Veyde participated in the Battle of Gangut and commanded a galley with Peter the Great on board. For this victory, Adam Veyde was awarded the Order of St. Andrew and appointed commander of a grenadier regiment. Also, he assisted Peter the Great in his composing of the Military Charter of 1716 and two years later was appointed president of College of War, for which he would elaborate the table of organization and charter.

== Death ==
Adam Veyde died in 1720. Although he was Lutheran, Peter the Great ordered his interment at the Lazarevskoe Cemetery in the Alexander Nevsky Lavra and attended his funeral personally.

== Sources ==
- "Вейде, Адам Адамович" . Brockhaus and Efron Encyclopedic Dictionary (in Russian). 1906.
