= Siege of Riga (1700) =

Sieges in the Great Northern War

- Part of the Great Northern War
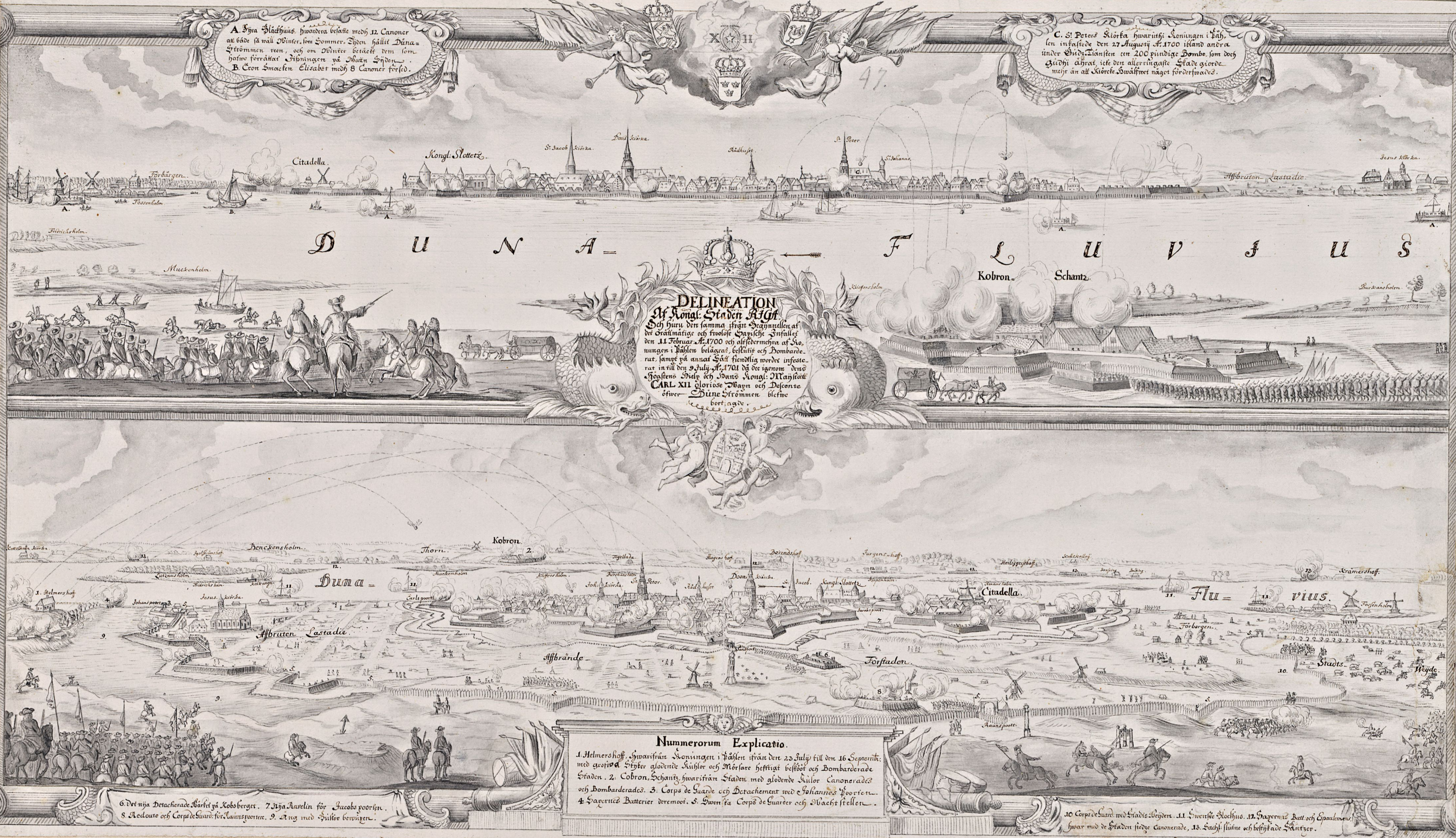
- Siege of Riga, by Johan Lithen
Date	February 12, 1700 (O.S.); February 22, 1700 (N.S.)
Location	Riga, Swedish Livonia (present-day Latvia) 56°57′00″N 24°6′00″E
Result	Swedish victory

Belligerents
(yes) Swedish Empire	Saxony

Commanders and leaders
(Swedish Empire) Erik Dahlbergh	(Electorate of Saxony) Augustus II the Strong

Strength
4,000 men	18,000 men

Casualties and losses
Unknown	Riga: Unknown Daugavgriva: 248 dead, 435 wounded

The sieges of Riga were two sieges which took place on February 22 and June 15, 1700, in Riga during the Great Northern War. The Swedish garrison of about 4,000 men under the command of Erik Dahlberg successfully repulsed the Saxons until the main Swedish army under Charles XII of Sweden arrived to sweep the Saxons away in the Battle of Riga which ended the period of sieges for the year.

The successful attempt to take the city from Sweden was made in the siege of Riga (1709–1710) by the Russians under Boris Sheremetev.

== Background ==
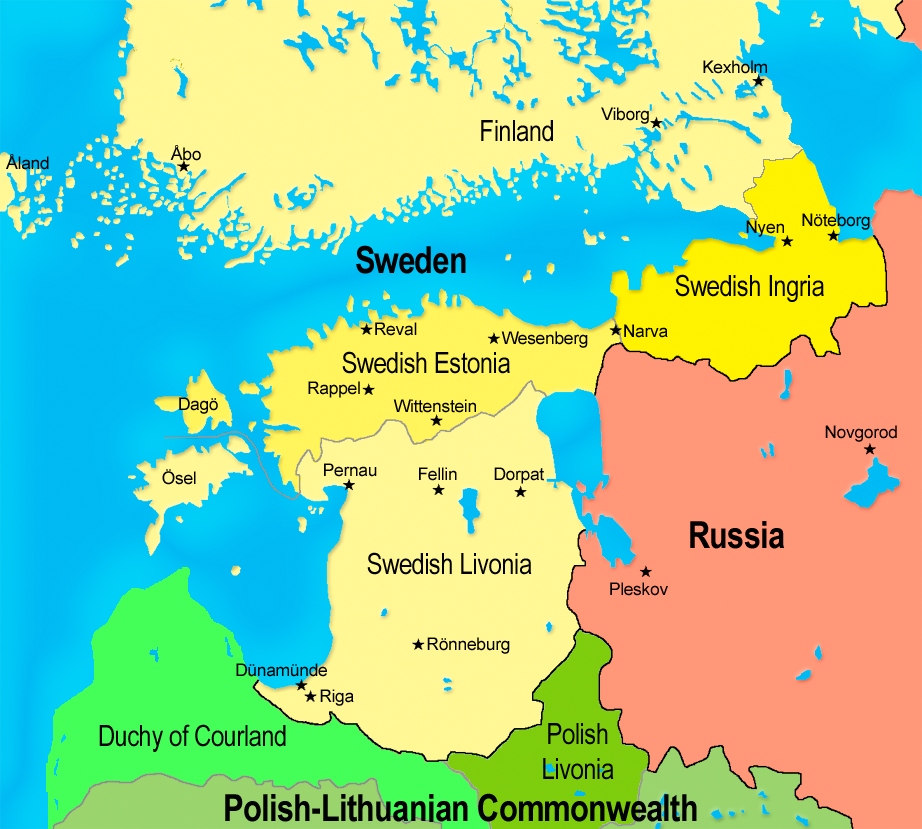
The Baltic provinces of the Swedish Empire in the 17th century, including Finland

In August 1698, Augustus II, ruler of the Polish-Lithuanian Commonwealth, and Peter I, Tsar of Russia, met in the town of Rava-Ruska (in present-day Western Ukraine) and agreed that Sweden must be stripped of its Baltic provinces: Livonia and Estonia would go to Poland-Lithuania, while Ingria and Karelia would go to Russia. Later, the Denmark-Norway union also joined the alliance. In August 1699, the Livonian nobility authorized von Patkul to sign, in Warsaw, the act of submission of the Livonian and Estonian nobility to Augustus II and his heirs (i.e., the Electors of Saxony). The coalition agreement in its final form was concluded on November 21, 1699, at Preobrazhenskoye (now part of Moscow), with Major General Johann Reinhold von Patkul responsible for planning the attack. In preparation for war, the Swedish Governor-General of Livonia, Erik Dahlberg, reinforced the fortification systems of Riga and other Livonian fortresses.

== Siege ==
According to Johann Patkul's plan, the Saxon army’s attack on Riga was supposed to take place at Christmas 1699. Four dragoon and three infantry regiments (about 7,000 Saxon soldiers) under General Patkul arrived at Jānišķi, on the border of Zemgale. However, upon learning about the mobilization of the fortress’s defenses, they postponed the attack until February 1700.

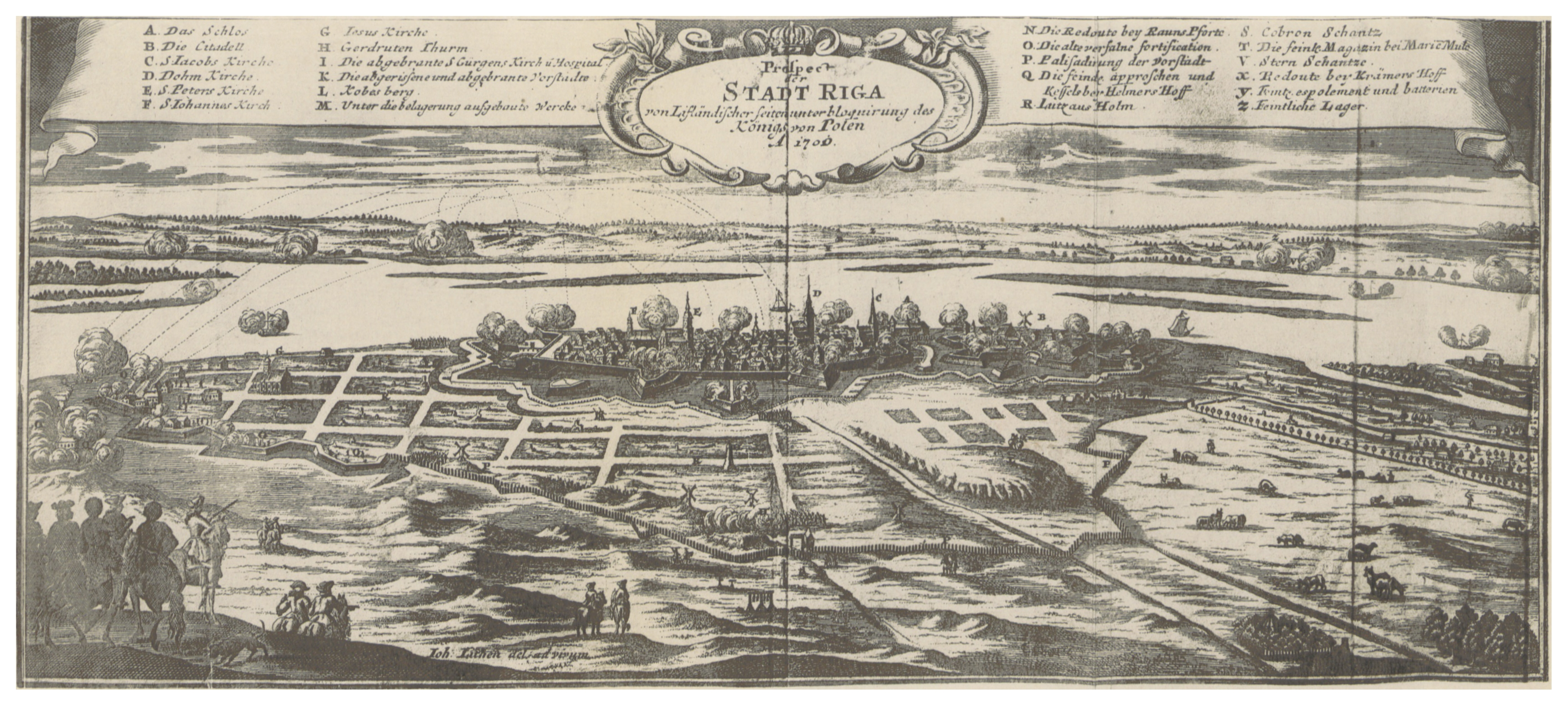
Bombardment of Riga, 1700. Drawing by Johan Lithen.

On February 11 (21), Saxon Major General Georg Karl von Carlowitz arrived at the Olaine border post with 80 dragoons and 12 covered wagons, requesting permission to travel to Moscow. Captain Eriksson, commanding the Swedish border guards, did not believe the story about the general’s personal belongings being transported in the wagons and ordered an inspection, discovering several dozen Saxon grenadiers disguised in peasant clothing, along with ammunition. After a brief skirmish, the Saxons retreated toward Jelgava, and Captain Eriksson was killed in the fighting. Despite this initial setback, Saxon General Jacob Heinrich von Flemming captured the Kobron redoubt on February 16, defended by 41 soldiers under Major Bildstein.

The Saxons crossed the Daugava River near Mazjumprava Manor, and Saxon dragoon units, along with Courland troops, raided as far as Valmiera. However, the Livonian nobility did not revolt against Swedish rule; instead, they gathered their forces under Colonel Magnus Johann von Tiesenhausen. The main Saxon forces stationed themselves at Mazjumprava Manor and Bukulti Castle.

On the night of March 24, 1700, the Saxon army under General Flemming crossed the frozen Buļļupe River and launched an attack on the Daugavgrīva fortress. The Swedish garrison of 500 men, led by Commandant Karl Ludwig von Budberg, repelled the assault, during which 248 Saxon soldiers were killed. Since the 600-man garrison had to fight against six Saxon battalions and the ice on the Daugava and Lielupe Rivers allowed attacks from all sides, the fortress's war council decided to surrender. On March 28, the Swedes left the fortress with their arms. Flemming renamed the fortress Augustusburg in honor of King Augustus II.

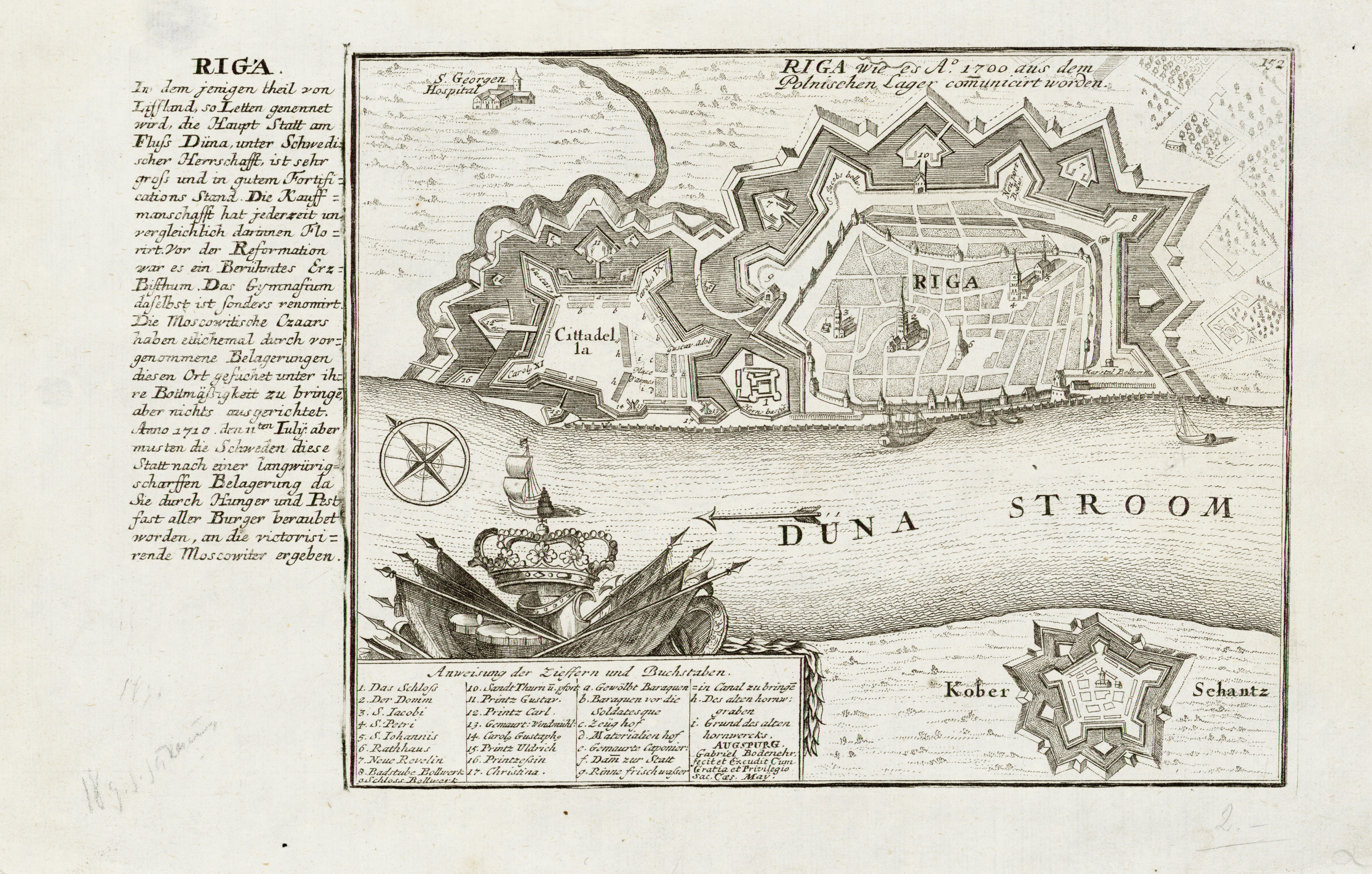
Riga as it was viewed from the Polish camp in 1700

Meanwhile, in April, the Swedes gathered about 11,000 soldiers near Viljandi under the command of Baltic German General Georg Johann Ernst von Maydell and the Governor-General of Ingria, Otto Vellingk. Prince Ferdinand of Courland took command of the Saxon forces. On May 6 (17), the Battle of Mazjumprava was fought, where the Swedes defeated the Saxons and forced them to retreat from the right bank of the Daugava, although they failed to recapture the Daugavgrīva fortress.

By mid-July 1700, Augustus II the Strong, ruler of Poland and Lithuania, gathered about 14,000 men near Riga under the command of Field Marshal Steinau. At the beginning of August, they crossed the Daugava again and defeated the Swedes at Ciemupe (Pröbstingshof, Sprēstiņi Manor). The Swedish forces, under General Vellingk, retreated to Rūjiena. Augustus II sent an ultimatum to Riga’s defenders, demanding capitulation within a week. After receiving no response from Dalberg, Saxon artillery began bombarding Riga on August 28. Upon hearing of Denmark’s defeat in the war, Augustus II decided to lift the siege of Riga, captured Koknese Castle on October 17, and settled into winter quarters in Selonia (Sēlija) and Lithuania.

On November 30, 1700, the Swedish King Charles XII crushed Peter I’s army at the Battle of Narva.

== Aftermath ==
The two sieges of Riga marked the beginning of the Great Northern War. This was to last over 20 years and end the dominance of the Swedes in the Baltic region (Dominium maris baltici).

The King of Poland felt unable to wage war against the Swedes alone. In February 1701, he met with the Tsar of Russia in the small town of Birze, on the border between Livonia and Samogitia. During these talks, which lasted several days, the tsar assured the Polish king of financial and military support in the fight against Charles XII. The Polish Diet also pledged its support after Peter the Great made a substantial financial contribution and Saxony-Poland and Russia prepared for the campaign against Sweden.
