= Yakov Fyodorovich Dolgorukov =

Russian senator, statesman and diplomat

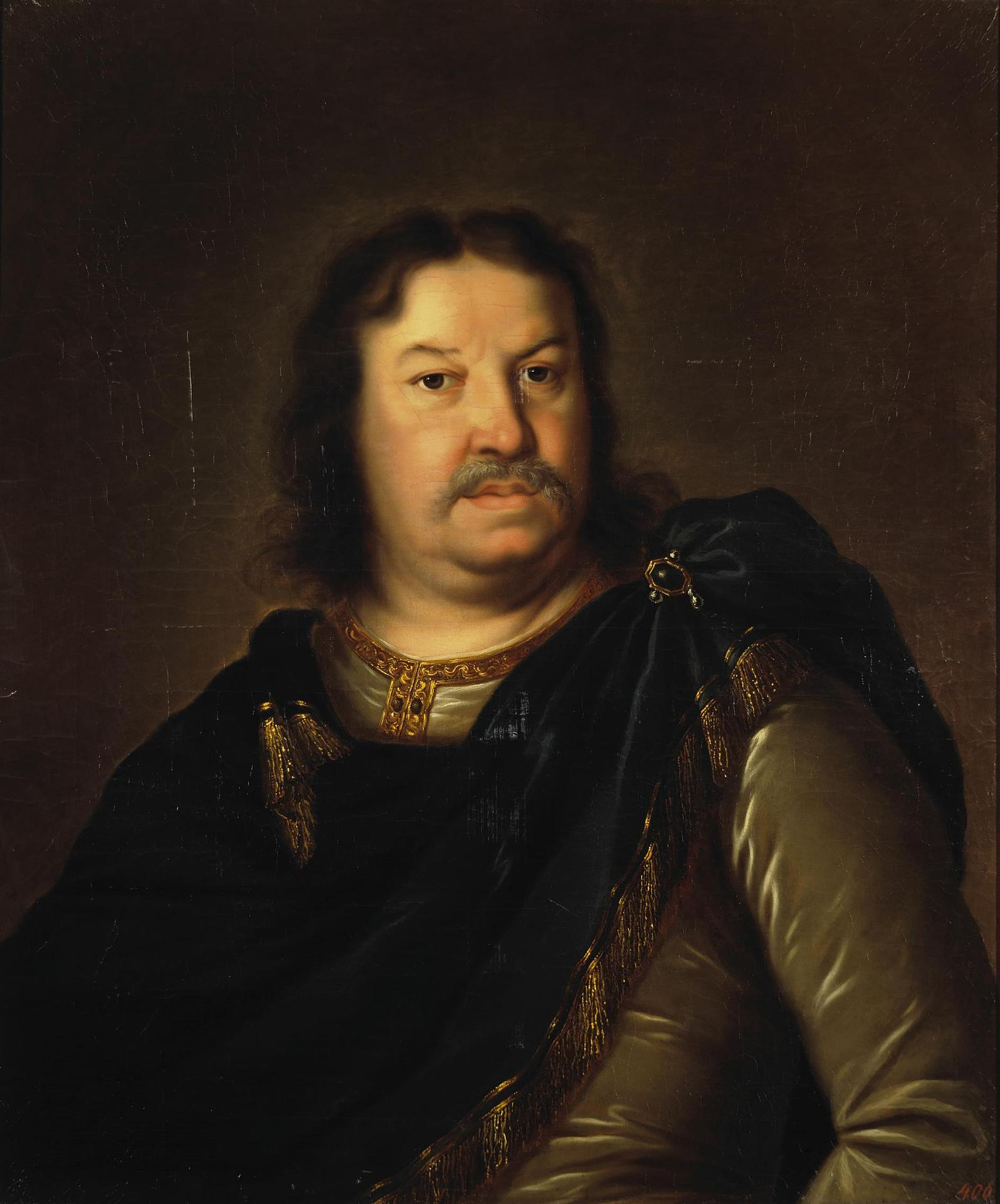
Portrait of Yakov

Prince Yakov Fyodorovich Dolgorukov (Jacob Dolgoruky) (1639–1720) was a Russian senator, statesman, soldier and diplomat. He was a close associate of Peter the Great who was known for his forthright criticism and advice to the Tsar. He frequently but respectfully challenged the Tsar when serving at court. However, he was an early supporter of the Tsar's attempts to reform and modernise Russia.

== Life ==
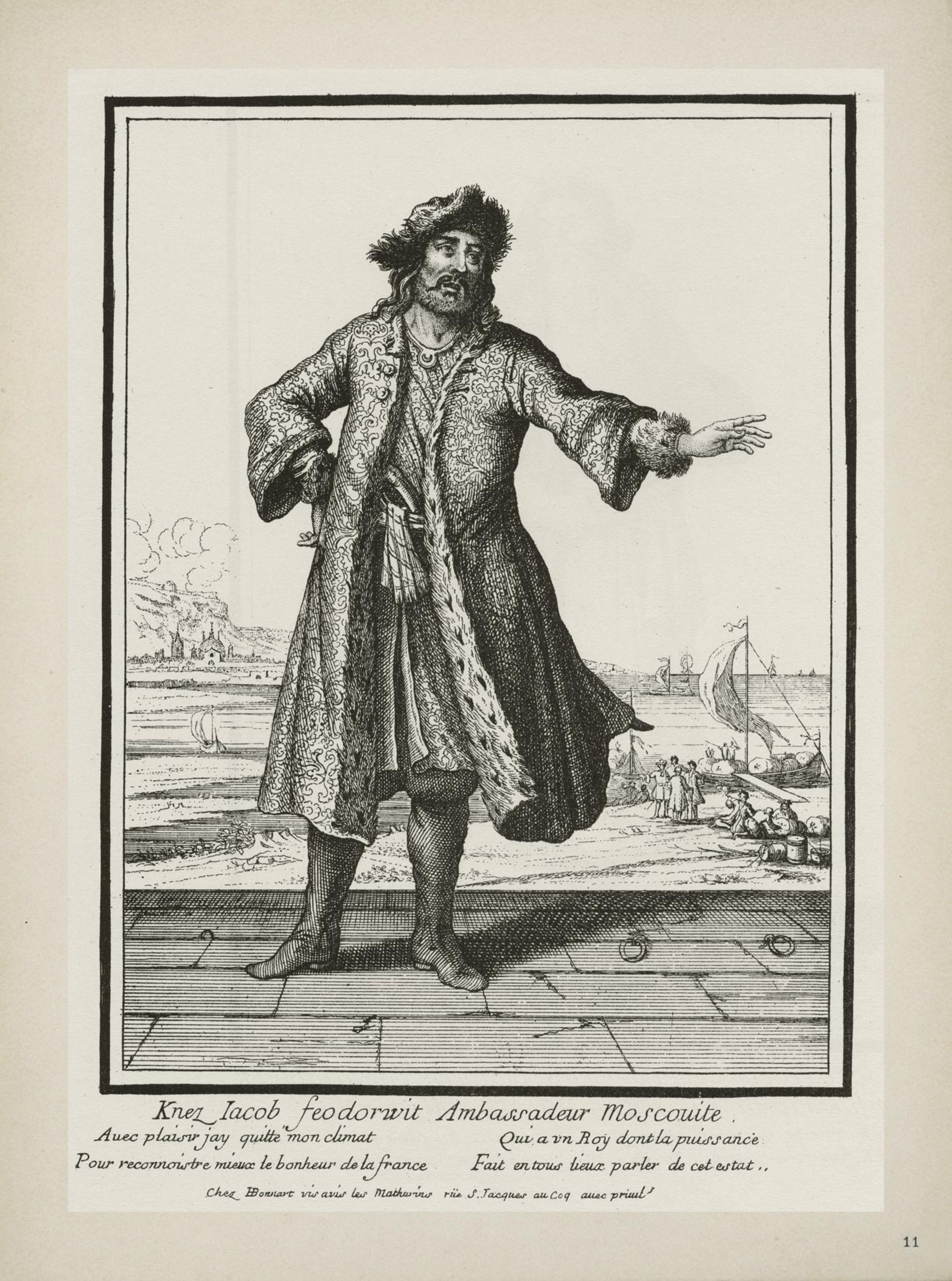
Yakov Fyodorovich Dolgorukov, 1686

He was the first Russian ambassador to serve at the court of Louis XIV of France.

In November 1700, he was serving with the forces of the Tsar at the battle of Narva but was captured and spent some 11 years in a Swedish prison.

On his return to Russia in 1712 he was appointed a senator in the Governing Senate.

In 1715, during an investigation of financial fraud in the court of the Tsar, he accused Alexander Danilovich Menshikov of corruption. The Tsar forgave Menshikov but Yakov and Menshikov became great rivals.

He died in 1720 at age 81.

== Bibliography ==
- Massie, Robert K. (2022-05-12). Peter the Great. Apollo. ISBN 978-1-80110-277-3.
