= The Swedish Lion in Narva =

Statue in Narva, Estonia

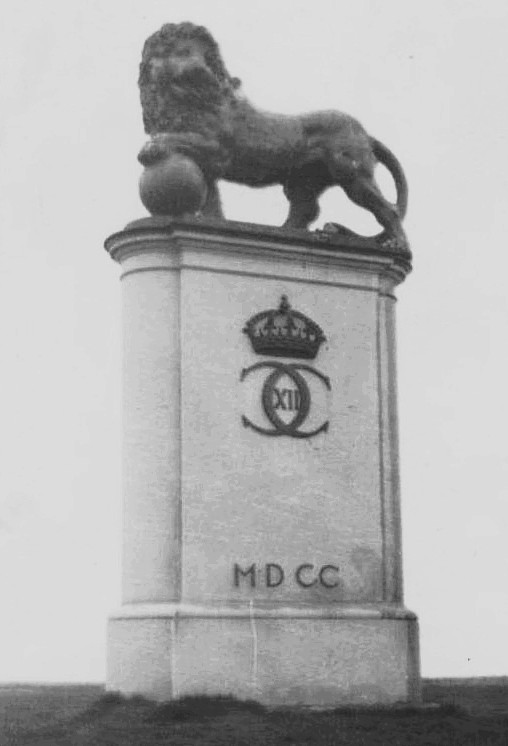
The first statue, 1936

The Swedish Lion, or "the lion monument of Narva", are two statues erected as monuments in memory of the 1700 battle of Narva in the city of Narva in Estonia.

The first version, a copy of one of the stone lions at the royal palace in Stockholm, the capital of Sweden, was erected by an entrance to the city of Narva in 1936, it was however destroyed during World War II. A new version, a copy of the "Medici lion" of the Royal Swedish Academy of Fine Arts, was erected by the Narva river in 2000.

== The first statue 1936–1944 ==
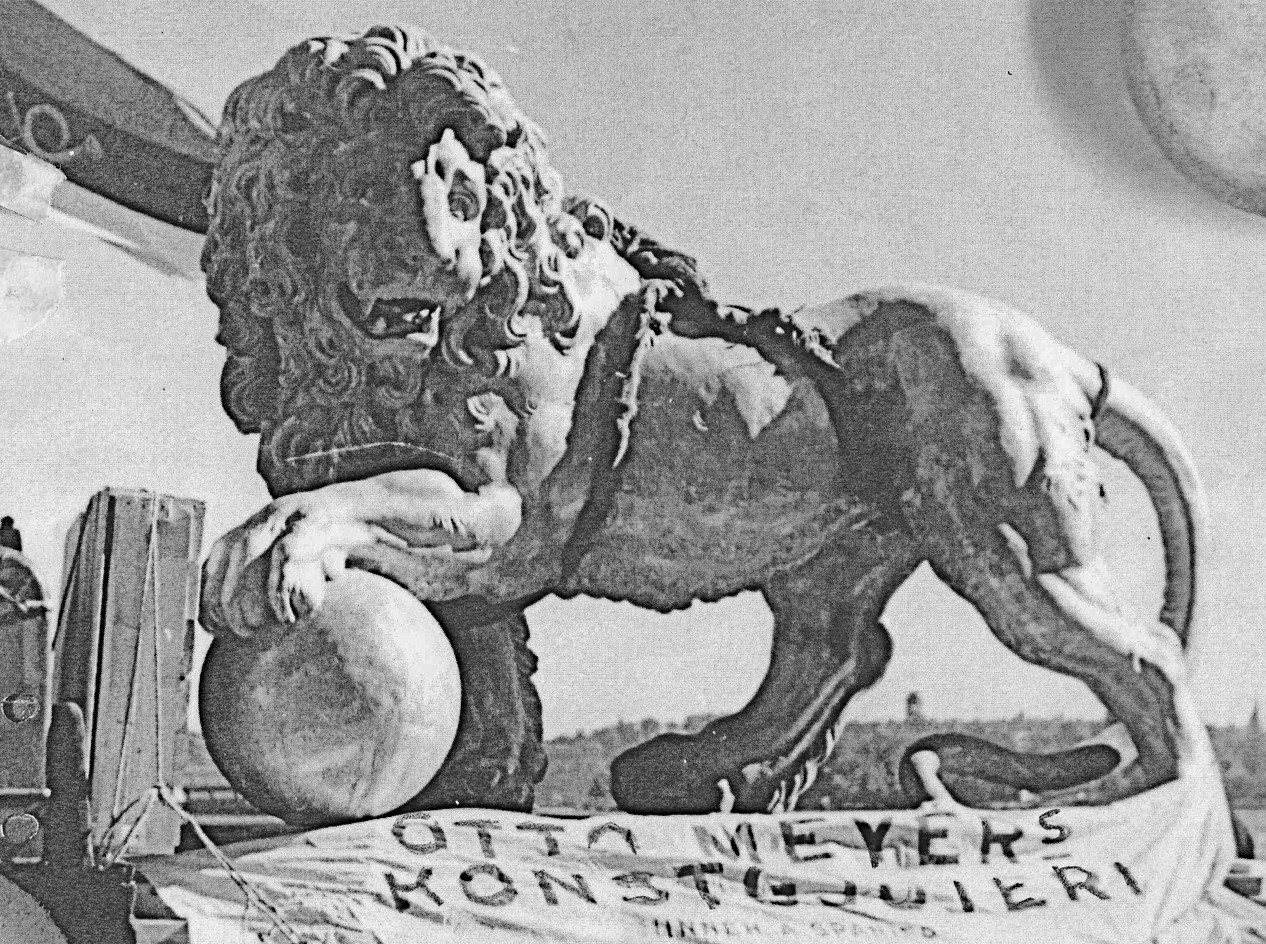
The first lion departing Stockholm to Narva, 1936

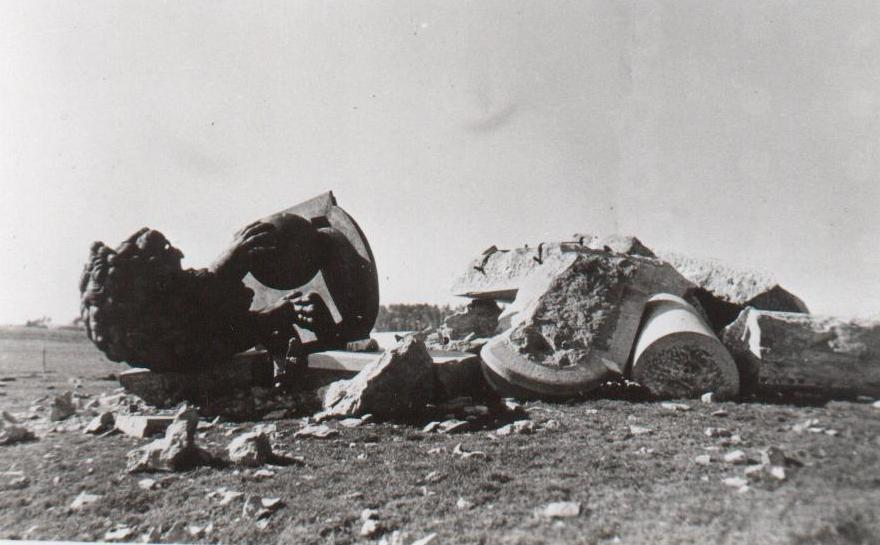
The first statue in ruins, 1944

The first statue was a copy of the eastern lion statue at Stockholm Palace and was cast by Meyers konstgjuteri in Stockholm. The monument was designed by professor Ragnar Östberg. The statue was inaugurated October 18, 1936 by prince Gustaf Adolf at the site of the battle of Narva, west of the city (59°23′7″N 28°8′59″E).

The monument was financed by the Narva committee which had been created for this purpose. The committee was chaired by count Folke Bernadotte.

The monument was hit by Soviet artillery in early summer 1944 during the battle of Narva. The valuable metal scraps were reused during the end of German occupation of Estonia by German defence industry. The only remnant of the monument is a rubble pile by E20 at the western entrance to Narva.

== The second statue 2000– ==
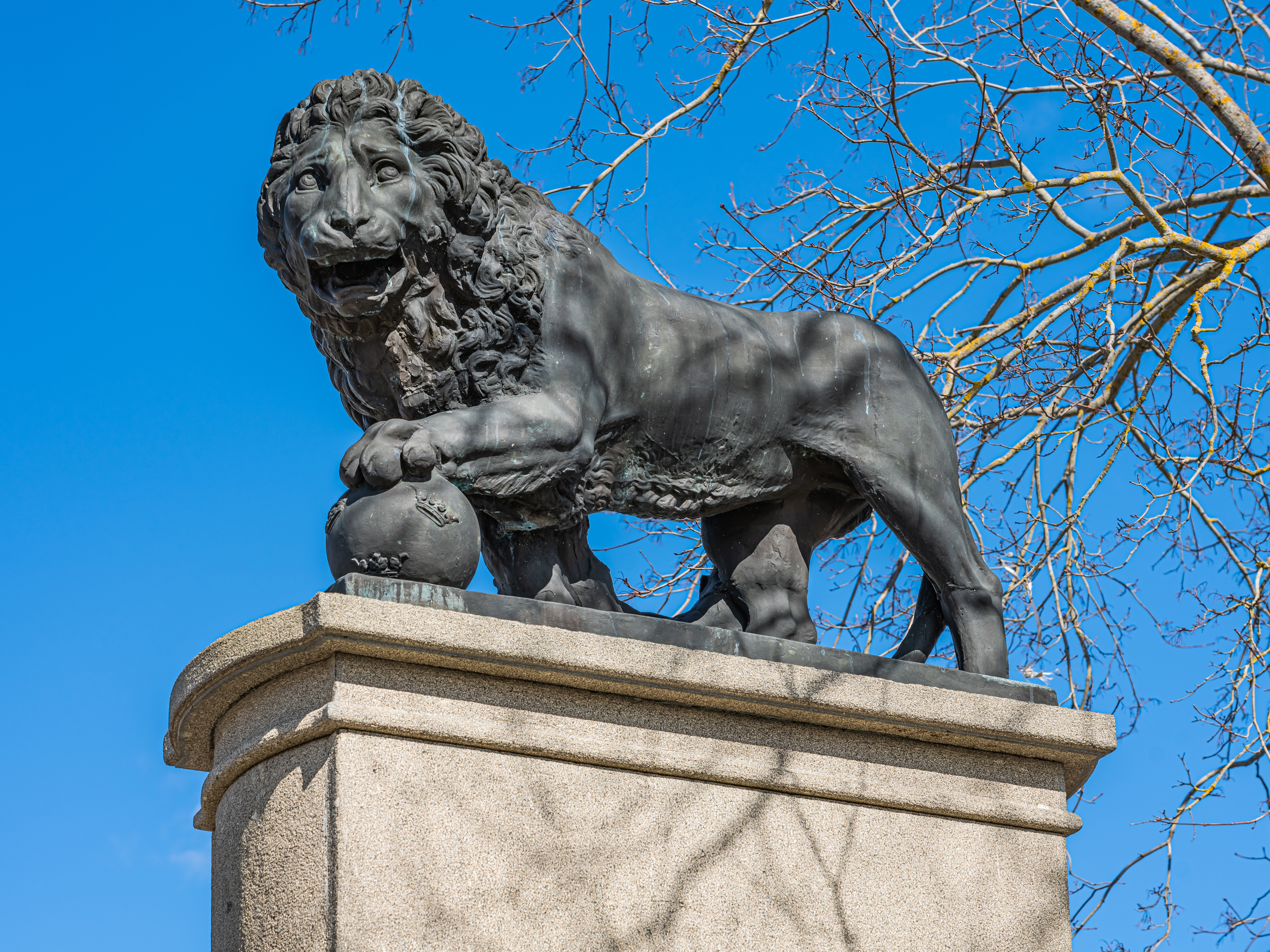
The second statue, 2000

A new monument was inaugurated by vice prime minister Lena Hjelm-Wallén on November 19, 2000 in connection with the 300 year anniversary of the battle of Narva. The new monument was erected as a memorial for all of those who died at the battle as well as the battle itself, and also as symbol of present-day cooperation between Estonia and Sweden.

The new monument is located at Hermann Castle by the Narva river (59°22′27″N 28°12′5″E) and is a bronze replica of the Royal Swedish Academy's lion, which itself is an early copy of one of the Medici lions. It is also the same lion that Bernhard Foucquet used as a starting point for the lions of Stockholm Palace. The monument is placed on a granite pedestal similar to the one designed by Ragnar Östberg for the first statue. The pedestal is inscribed with the Latin text SVECIA MEMOR ("Sweden remembers") and MDCC (1700, the year of the battle of Narva).

The project was carried out by the Swedish Institute and financed by Swedish businesses in Estonia. Key supporters of the new Narva monument were historian Eldar Efendijev, the mayor of Narva at the time, and Hans Lepp, the cultural head of the Swedish Institute and former cultural attaché of Sweden in the Baltic countries.

== Sources ==
- Westberg, Lennart (1991). "Narva-lejonet: ett karolinermonuments öde i Estland". Karolinska förbundets årsbok (in Swedish). Stockholm: Karolinska förbundet. pp. 122–137. ISSN 0348-9833.
