= General of the Artillery (Russian Empire) =

In the Imperial Russian army, General of the Artillery was the second-highest possible rank, below Generalissimo of Russia or General-Fieldmarshal, produced by splitting General-in-Chief into service branches. The rank derived from that of Feldzeugmeister (literally: "field equipment master") used in German-speaking armies and was introduced into Russia by Peter the Great in 1699. The first holder of the rank was the Georgian prince Alexander of Imereti.
