= Prince Alexander of Imereti (1674–1711) =

Georgian prince of the Kingdom of Imereti

Prince Royal Alexander
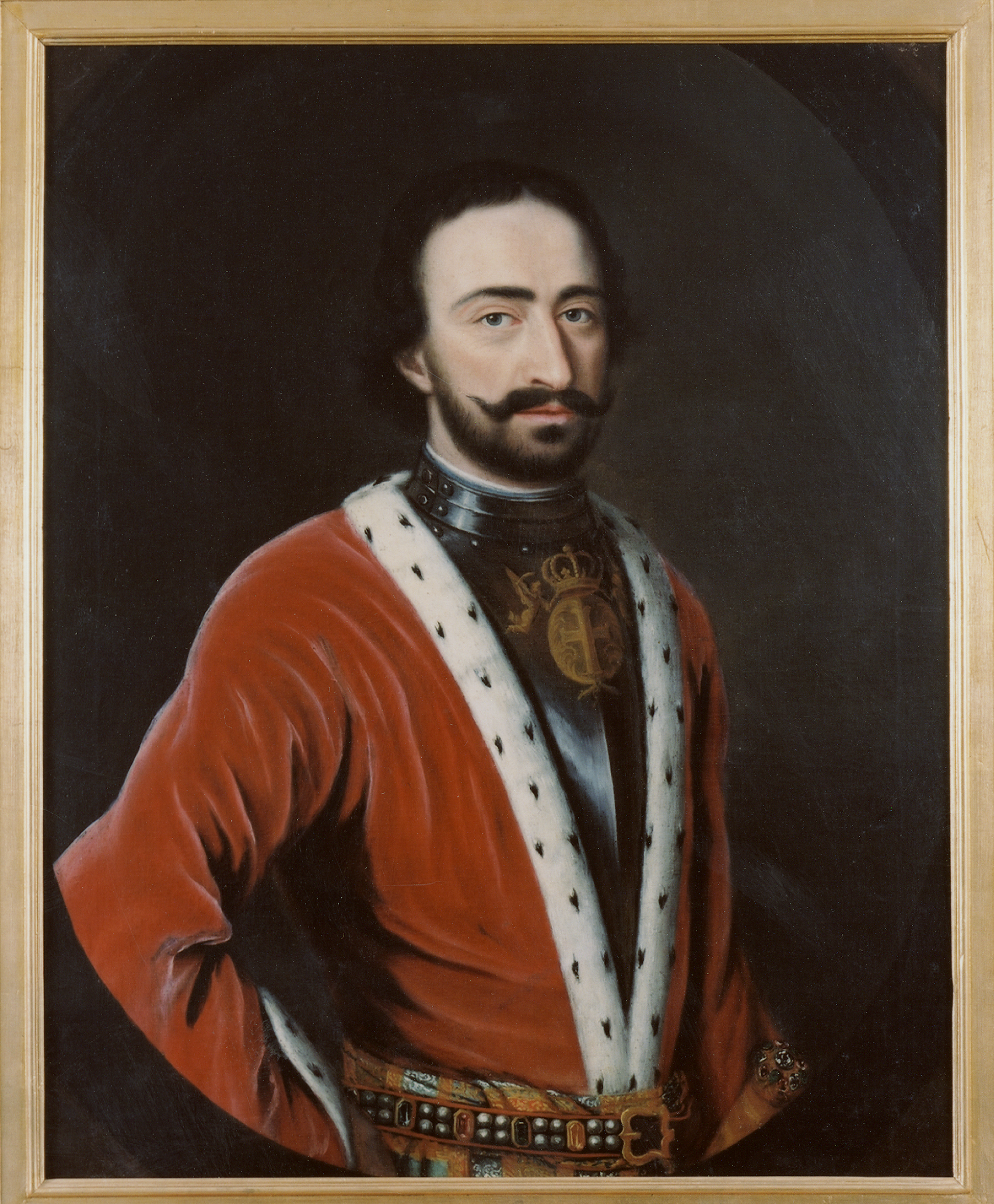
- Alexander in plate armor and ermine coat, before 1700. Painting of Martin Mijtens the Elder, kept at the Gripsholm Castle
- Born: 1674
- Died: 20 February 1711 (aged 36–37); Piteå, Kingdom of Sweden
- Burial place: Donskoy Monastery, Moscow, Russia
- Military career
- Allegiance: Russian Empire
- Rank: General Feldzeugmeister
- Commands: Chief of Russian artillery (1700)
- Conflicts: Great Northern War; Battle of Narva (POW)

Prince Alexander (Georgian: ალექსანდრე, Alek'sandre), also known as Tsarevich Aleksandr Archilovich Imeretinsky (Russian: Александр Арчилович Имеретинский) (1674 – 20 February 1711) was a Georgian royal prince (batonishvili) of the Kingdom of Imereti. He lived as an émigré in the Tsardom of Russia and subsequently served as first General of the Artillery (Feldzeugmeister), the second highest military rank under Tsar Peter the Great. During the Great Northern War, Alexander was taken prisoner at Narva in 1700 and spent ten years in Swedish captivity. He died on his way back to Russia.

== Family background ==
Alexander was born in Tbilisi to Archil II, a Georgian prince of the Mukhranian Bagrationi royal line and sometime King of Imereti who subsequently fled the anarchy in his country to the Russian Empire. Alexander's mother Ketevan was a member of the Kakhetian Bagrationi royal line.

== Early life ==
Alexander and his brother, Mamuka (Matvey) (died in 1693), were brought by their father, Archil, to Moscow on 10 August 1684. They were raised at the court under the auspices of Knyaz Fedul Volkonsky and Dyak Ivan Kazarinov. Alexander was befriended by the young Russian Tsar Peter I, whom he joined in his war games. On 30 July 1688, Alexander and Mamuka left Moscow to join their father in his eventually failed attempt to recover the lost throne of Imereti. Back in Russia in 1692, Alexander followed Peter in the Grand Embassy to Europe in 1697 and was sent to The Hague to study gunnery and related sciences. He stayed there until 1699, after which he visited his father at a Russian military settlement on the Terek delta before returning to Moscow. On 19 May 1700 he became the first Russian officer to be promoted to the rank of General Feldzeugmeister and appointed the chief of the Pushkarsky Prikaz (literally, "cannon administration").

== Battle of Narva ==
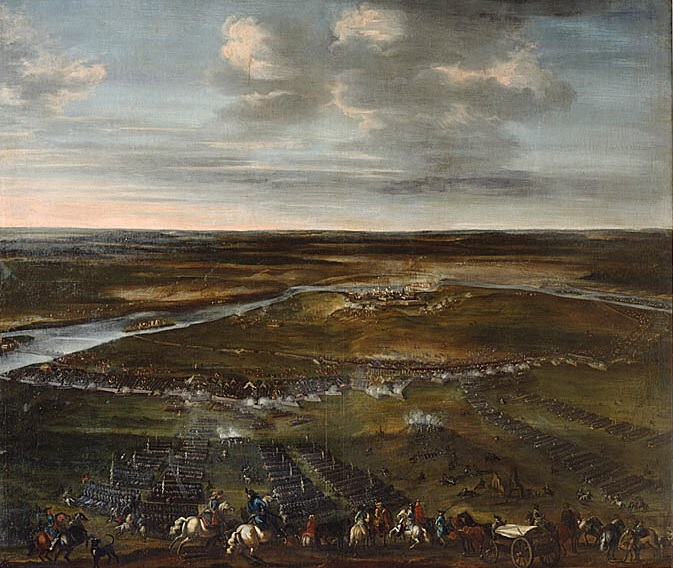
The Battle of Narva, a painting by Daniel Stawert.

With the outbreak of the Great Northern War, in which Russia confronted Sweden, Prince Alexander was put in command of the Russian artillery. He was part of the army sent against the Swedish-garrisoned Baltic fortress of Narva in October 1700, and the force under his command comprised between 139 and 181 artillery pieces. Alexander positioned nearly all of his artillery—many larger guns being quite antiquated—for the bombardment of Narva, leaving the rear of the Russian positions exposed. In the ensuing battle of Narva, a relief army led by Charles XII of Sweden inflicted a disastrous defeat on the Russian forces on 19 November 1700. The entire artillery train was lost to the victor. Most Russian general officers surrendered; Prince Alexander, Prince Iakov Dolgorukov, Avtonom Golovin, and Ivan Buturlin were the last to do so. According to Voltaire's 1731 Histoire de Charles XII, the captured Prince Alexander was snatched by the Swedish general Count Carl Gustav Rehnskiöld from the hands of Finnish soldiers who were about to kill him.

== Prisoner of war ==
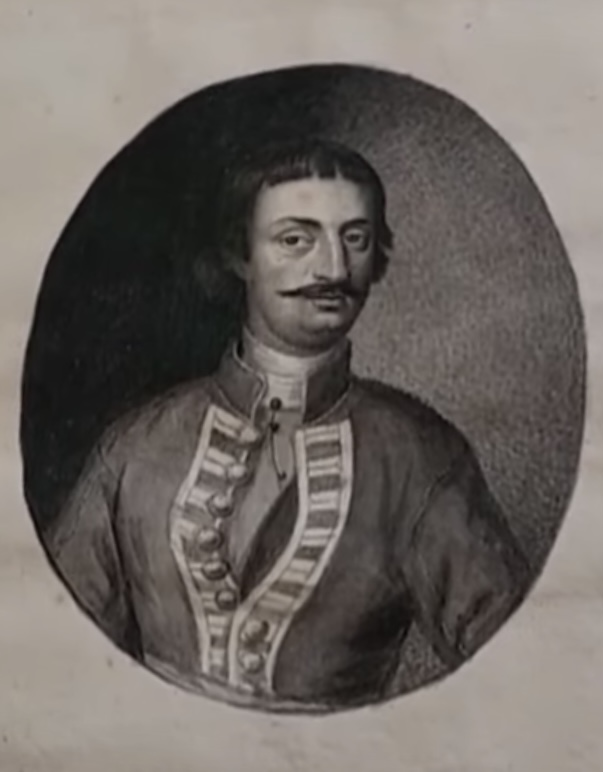
Alexander's image painted during his time being a prisoner in Sweden.

After being held prisoner at Narva and Reval, Alexander was taken to Stockholm in May 1701. The Swedes regarded him as the highest-ranking of the aristocratic prisoners of war. He was confined at the home of Chief Inspector Stierndahl, but later apparently moved to the Treasurer's House (Räntmästarhuset) at Skeppsbron. Alexander enjoyed more freedom than other Russian prisoners and was on good terms with many at the Royal Council and court. Among these was Johan Gabriel Sparwenfeld, who had been close to Alexander and his father during his stay in Moscow. Sparwenfeld helped Alexander to have the Georgian fonts cast in Stockholm and send home to Moscow.

The conditions were tightened in 1705. When the Swedes discovered that the prince had been in secret correspondence discussing escape plans with the fellow internee Prince Iakov Dolgorukov, Alexander was banished to a castle at Linköping. As his health deteriorated, the prince was transferred from the castle to a house in the town and, in April 1706, returned to Stockholm. In 1708, the prince and other Russian detainees were discovered to possess drawings of Swedish fortifications, and on Charles XII's order, their rights, including that of correspondence, were again restricted. Alexander, however, continued to enjoy certain favor with the dowager queen and Princess Ulrika Eleonora and was allowed, to the displeasure of the Defense Commission, to visit the court.

In his quest to secure Alexander's release, the ex-king Archil tried to approach the Habsburg court for mediation. Prince von Kaunitz, the Imperial Chancellor, instructed the Habsburg ambassador at Stockholm to intercede at the Swedish court, but nothing came of this. Archil then, in February 1706, personally appealed to Charles XII, imploring him to exchange Alexander for a number of Swedish prisoners-of-war. According to one account, the Swedes countered with demands for the release of 60 of their officers in a prisoner swap. Tsar Peter inquired if Alexander himself was ready to accept such a precondition and the prince rejected the offer.

== Release and death ==
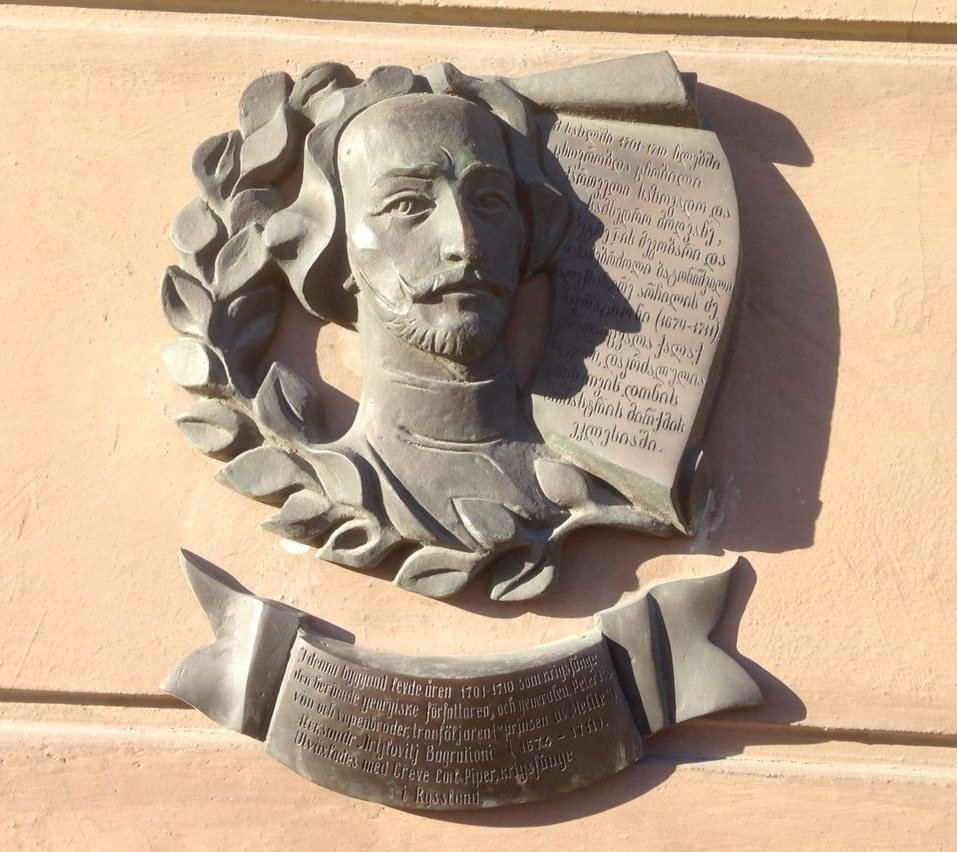
A plaque in Stockholm commemorating Prince Alexander.

During the plague outbreak, Alexander was evacuated to Örebro in October 1710. In connection with the 1710 prisoner exchange, Alexander was finally released and allowed to return home. In December 1710, he set off on a journey, through Gävle and Umeå, around the Gulf of Bothnia. By that time, the prince's health had severely deteriorated, but he turned down all suggestions that he rest. He died on 3 February 1711 in Piteå, of kidney stones or kidney failure. His remains were transported to Villnäs (Askainen) and reburied to the Donskoy Monastery near Moscow in March 1712. The bilingual Georgian-Swedish memorial plaque currently displayed on the Treasurer's House in Stockholm erroneously indicates that he lived there the entire time he was in Sweden from 1701 to 1710. Further, the plaque also mistakenly states that he was exchanged for the Swedish count Carl Piper.

According to Voltaire, Charles XII had himself commented on the Georgian prince's vicissitudes: "It is, said he, as if I were one day to be a prisoner among the Crimean Tatars", the words that would prove prophetic—an allusion to Charles's enforced residence in the Ottoman territory after his defeat at the Battle of Poltava in 1709.

Prince Alexander is a purported translator of The Testament of Basil the Macedonian into Georgian.

== Family ==
Prince Alexander was married twice. He wed c. 1688 Feodosya Miloslavskaya (died 1689), daughter of the Russian boyar Ivan Mikhailovich Miloslavsky. Her dowry, the village of Vsekhsvyatskoye near Moscow eventually became a possession of the Georgian royal repatriates in Russia. Alexander married his second wife, Princess Glikeria Bagration-Davitishvili (1672 – 28 July 1720), daughter of Prince Elizbar (Ilia) around 1690. The marriage produced Alexander's only child, Sophia (18 September 1691 – 4 January 1747), who married Georgian exile in Russia, Major-General Prince Igor Dadiani (1691–1765).

== Sources ==
- "Имеретинские, князья" . Brockhaus and Efron Encyclopedic Dictionary (in Russian). 1906.
- (in Russian) Александр Арчилович. Russian Biographic Lexicon. Retrieved on April 14, 2007.
