= Battle of Narva (1700) =

Major battle of the Great Northern War

- Part of the Great Northern War
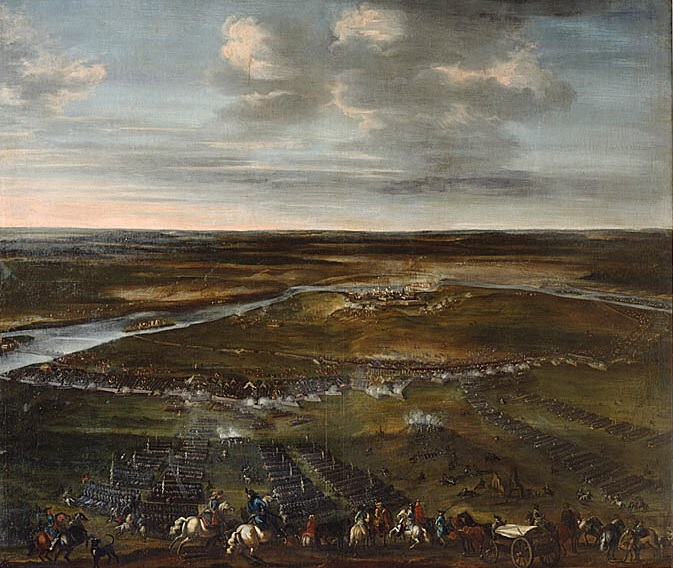
- The Battle of Narva (1700). Daniel Stawert, 1713
Date	19 November 1700 (O.S.); 20 November 1700 (S.S.); 30 November 1700 (N.S.)
Location	Narva, Ingria, Swedish Empire (present-day Estonia) 59.375°N 28.180°E
Result	Swedish victory
Territorial changes	Russia evacuates its forces from Ingria

Belligerents
Swedish Empire	Tsardom of Russia

Commanders and leaders
Charles XII; Carl Gustav Rehnskiöld; Otto Vellingk	Charles Eugène de Croÿ (POW); Avtonom Golovin (POW); Ivan Trubetskoy (POW); Adam Veyde (POW); Alexander of Imereti (POW); Yakov Dolgorukov (POW); Ivan Buturlin (POW); Boris Sheremetev

Strength
Narva garrison: 1,800 men, 297 artillery pieces Relief force: 10,500 men, 37 cannons^{[a]}	33,384–37,000 men 195 artillery pieces^{[b]}

Casualties and losses
667 killed 1,247 wounded^{[c]}	8,000–9,000 killed, wounded, or drowned 20,000 surrendered 700 men captured along with 177 artillery pieces (incl. 145 cannons) and 171 standards/banners^{[d]} An unknown number of deserters frozen to death. Total: >18,000
- Notes: ^[a] About 12,300 men of which 1,800 were stationed in Narva with 297 artillery pieces and 10,537 (5,889 infantry, 4,314 cavalry, 37 cannons with 334 crew) assaulting the Russians.; ^[b] Up to 37,000 men of which 4,000 were deployed at the siege-works with 125 artillery pieces and 33,000 (23,652 infantry, 9,000 cavalry, 70 cannons with 321 crew) facing the Swedes.; ^[c] Reports of 31 officers and 636 privates dead, 66 officers and 1,181 privates wounded. Another report claims almost 900 dead Swedish troops; ^[d] Almost the entire Russian force was either killed or captured during the battle (except for some 4,000 cavalry who managed to escape over the Kamperholm bridge). 8,000 Russians were reported killed and another 1,000 drowned. Over 20,000 were captured and disarmed but later set free and allowed to march to Russia (except for 700 men [134 officers] who were set prisoners). 23,000 out of initially 37,000 Russians managed to return to Russian territory, estimating the Russian final casualties to be about 14,000 either dead during the battle or the harsh march back to Russia. The Swedes also seized 171 standards and banners, 145 cannons, 28 mortars and four howitzers as well as 24,000 muskets.

The Battle of Narva (Note: (Russian: Битва при Нарве, Bitva pri Narve; Swedish: Slaget vid Narva.) on 30 November 1700 (Note: 30 November [O.S. 19 November] 1700 (20 November in the Swedish transitional calendar)) was an early battle in the Great Northern War. A Swedish relief army under Charles XII of Sweden defeated a Russian siege force three to four times its size. Previously, Charles XII had forced Denmark–Norway to sign the Treaty of Travendal. Narva was not followed by further advances of the Swedish army into Russia; instead, Charles XII turned southward to expel August the Strong from Livonia and Poland–Lithuania. Tsar Peter the Great of Russia took Narva in a second battle in 1704.

== Background ==
During the 17th century, Russia was less advanced technologically than the rest of Europe, a condition which extended to its armed forces. Despite this shortcoming, Peter the Great of Russia was keen to get "an adequate opening to the Baltic" by conquering parts of Sweden's Baltic provinces that Russia had lost during the Time of Troubles. However, there was a problem: while most states' armies of the time consisted of poorly trained militia and small contingents of mercenaries, Sweden had a professional army, one of the largest and most disciplined of northern Europe.

Peter the Great would drastically modernize Russia in the coming years, but the army with which he traveled in 1700 was still poorly drilled. Preparing for war, he decided to form 31 new regiments. At the same time, in the spring of 1700, a revision of the officer corps was made whereby most officers were sent into retirement or to garrison units to serve without pay. A catastrophic shortage of command personnel (up to 70% at the company level) resulted. The vacancies were filled with young Moscow noblemen who had neither the experience of command nor the experience of service in the infantry nor regular military training—their traditional places were elite irregular cavalry or court service. Non-commissioned officers also experienced serious problems—they were not veteran soldiers but were elected from recruits.

== Prelude ==
Russia made a military alliance with Frederick IV, King of Denmark–Norway; and Augustus the Strong, King of Poland–Lithuania and elector of Saxony, to wage war against Sweden whereupon three countries attacked Sweden from different directions. The Danish and Saxon armies acted indecisively, bounding themselves to unsuccessful sieges of fortresses. The Polish-Lithuanian Commonwealth refused to support its king, and Russia waited for a peace treaty with the Ottoman Empire to transfer its struggle from south to north.

Charles XII, assisted by the Royal Navy and the Dutch Navy, first landed in Humlebæk north of Copenhagen and forced Denmark-Norway to leave the alliance in August 1700 (until 1709). He then moved part of the Swedish army across the Baltic Sea to Estonia, where Estonian and Finnish regiments of the Swedish army joined it.

During November, Russian troops surrounded the city of Narva in Estonia (part of the Swedish Empire at the time), attempting to secure its surrender via siege. August II commanded a Saxon-Polish army, and Steinau was outside Riga in Swedish Livonia. The Saxon-Polish army, however, had gone into winter camp south of the river Daugava. Hence, Charles XII decided to deal with the more immediate Russian threat against Narva, which was under siege by Peter's forces.

== High command ==
The Swedish army was commanded personally by Charles XII, assisted by Lieutenant-General Carl Gustav Rehnskiöld and General of the cavalry Otto Vellingk. During the Scanian War in 1675–1679, Vellingk was already a colonel and commanded a cavalry regiment, and Rehnskiöld rose from lieutenant to lieutenant-colonel. Both also had the experience of service in foreign armies: Vellingk served for ten years in France, during which he rose to the rank of colonel, and Rehnskiöld participated in the Franco-Dutch War (1688—1697). From 1698 Vellingk was a governor in Ingermanland and at the beginning of the Great Northern War commanded a small corps, sent to help besieged Riga.

Peter and Charles Eugène de Croÿ commanded the Russian forces. Peter had left Narva just the day before and was not present during the actual fighting. Trying to explain this act, some historians suggest that he did not expect an immediate attack on his well-fortified and numerically superior force, or he was sure that such an attack would be easily repulsed. It is suggested that Peter wanted to speed up the arrival of reinforcements, address supply issues, and negotiate with Augustus. Some interpretations consider his departure from Narva the night before the battle as cowardly; most of Europe mocked the Tsar for his departure. However, some scholars believe this accusation has little merit, as reportedly, the Tsar had placed himself in physical danger too many times for this departure to be an act of cowardice.

Peter not only left the army on the eve of the battle but also took with him the formal commander-in-chief—Field Marshal Fyodor Golovin. The new commander-in-chief, de Croÿ, was not at all a Russian general—August II sent him with a diplomatic mission (he asked for an auxiliary Russian corps) and met with Peter in Novgorod only on 10 September [O.S. 30 August] 1700. Due to a lack of experienced commanders, Peter retained de Croÿ with him; they reconnoitered the fortifications of Narva together, but de Croÿ did not hold any official post and never before commanded any unit of the Russian army. De Croÿ refused to accept the command several times and relented only after Peter personally "strengthened his resolve with a glass of wine". This happened only the day before the battle, and the official instruction for the transfer of command was dated 30 November [O.S. 19 November] 1700, i.e., when the Swedish relief force arrived at Narva.

The Russian army near Narva was divided into three main parts (general'stvo), commanded by Avtonom Golovin, Trubetskoy, and Weide. All of them were young men (born in 1667), and their combat experience was limited to the two sieges of the Turkish fortress of Azov, but they had served in Peter's favorite poteshnye voiska. More experienced generals were sent to command remote garrisons. A popular commander, Sheremetev, known for his successful actions against Turks, had no rank in the hierarchy of the regular army and was ordered to command the feudal levy cavalry.

The Swedish artillery was commanded by experienced Master-General of the Ordnance Johan Siöblad. He had almost forty years of service in artillery and was an author of the first Swedish Artillery Regulation of 1690. Massie notes the excellent actions of the Swedish artillery in the skirmish at Pyhajoggi Pass, eighteen miles west of Narva. Under the screen of their dragoons, the cannons were quickly deployed and suddenly opened fire on the clusters of Russian cavalry from a close distance. Since the Russians had no artillery at Pyhajoggi, they could not hold this advantageous position and had to retreat.

The formal commander of Russian artillery was Prince Alexander of Imereti, a young man of 26, a close companion of Peter in his entourage. His experience was limited to several months studying the theoretical foundations of gunnery in The Hague in 1697. After his return to Moscow, he soon received the highest artillery rank of General Feldzeugmeister (May 1700). There is much evidence of the extremely unsuccessful actions of Russian siege artillery against Narva.

== Battle ==
=== Preparations ===
On the afternoon of 29 November [O.S. 18 November] 1700, Charles XII approached the village of Lagena, 7 miles from Narva, and made a final inspection of his army. Charles was not sure if Narva was still holding, so he ordered to give the Swedish recognition signal by cannon shots and then got the same response from the fortress. Earlier, the Sheremetev's cavalry joined the main forces. Thus, the Russian siege camp was warned about the enemy's approach. De Croÿ inspected the army and ordered it to increase vigilance, prepare firearms, and keep half of the army on alert throughout the night. On the morning of the next day, "before sunrise," it was ordered to give soldiers the charges and build the entire army. Among other instructions was the prohibition against opening fire earlier than 20–30 steps to the enemy.

On 19 (OS), 20 (S.S.) or 30 (NS) November 1700, Charles XII positioned his 10,500 men (another 2,000 men were garrisoned in the city and would take part in the battle at a later stage) opposite the besieging Russian army of about 34,000 to 40,000 troops.

The Swedes approached the Russian army at 10 a.m. and began to prepare for an attack. Charles and his generals examined the Russian position, and the soldiers stored the fascines to overcome the ditches surrounding it. De Croÿ was concerned about the small size of the Swedish army and suspected that this was only the vanguard of the main forces. Sheremetev proposed to lead the army out of the entrenchment in the field and attack the Swedes but was not supported by other generals. De Croÿ decided to leave the army stretched for 4 miles (6.4 km) and sandwiched between two rows of ramparts. The space between the ramparts was uneven: about 1,200 metres (3,900 ft) on the right Russian flank, about 250 metres (820 ft) in the center, and on the left flank – only 60–100 metres (200–330 ft). There were many barracks for soldiers between the ramparts, which made it difficult to maneuver.

In the center of the Russian position was the Goldenhof Hill, fenced on all sides by barracks and sharpened stakes (the chevaux de frise) and adapted to all-around defence. Charles divided his infantry into two parts and directed them to the north and south of the Goldenhof Hill. On the right (southern) flank were 11 "field" battalions under the command of Vellingk. On the left (northern) flank were 10 "field" battalions under the command of Rehnskiöld, including a small column of two battalions under the command of Magnus Stenbock, where Charles was himself. Grenadiers with fascines marched in the vanguard of the infantry columns. The Swedish cavalry (≈4,300 men) covered the flanks of the infantry and had to prevent Russian attempts to exit the fortifications. The Swedish artillery (37 guns at all), located on a small rise, bombarded the places planned for the attack.

The exact battle order of the Russian army is unknown – Russian documents are not preserved, and the Swedish data are contradictory. It is known that the "division" (general'stvo) of Trubetskoy was located in the center. It was the weakest part of the three main divisions: there were only two "regular" infantry regiments, and they were even worse drilled than the rest – they were formed as late as August 1700, and in September, Trubetskoy already marched to Narva. Trubetskoy also had four weak regiments of local streltsy from Novgorod and Pskov garrisons and, may be, there were two regular infantry regiments temporarily separated from other divisions.

=== Action ===
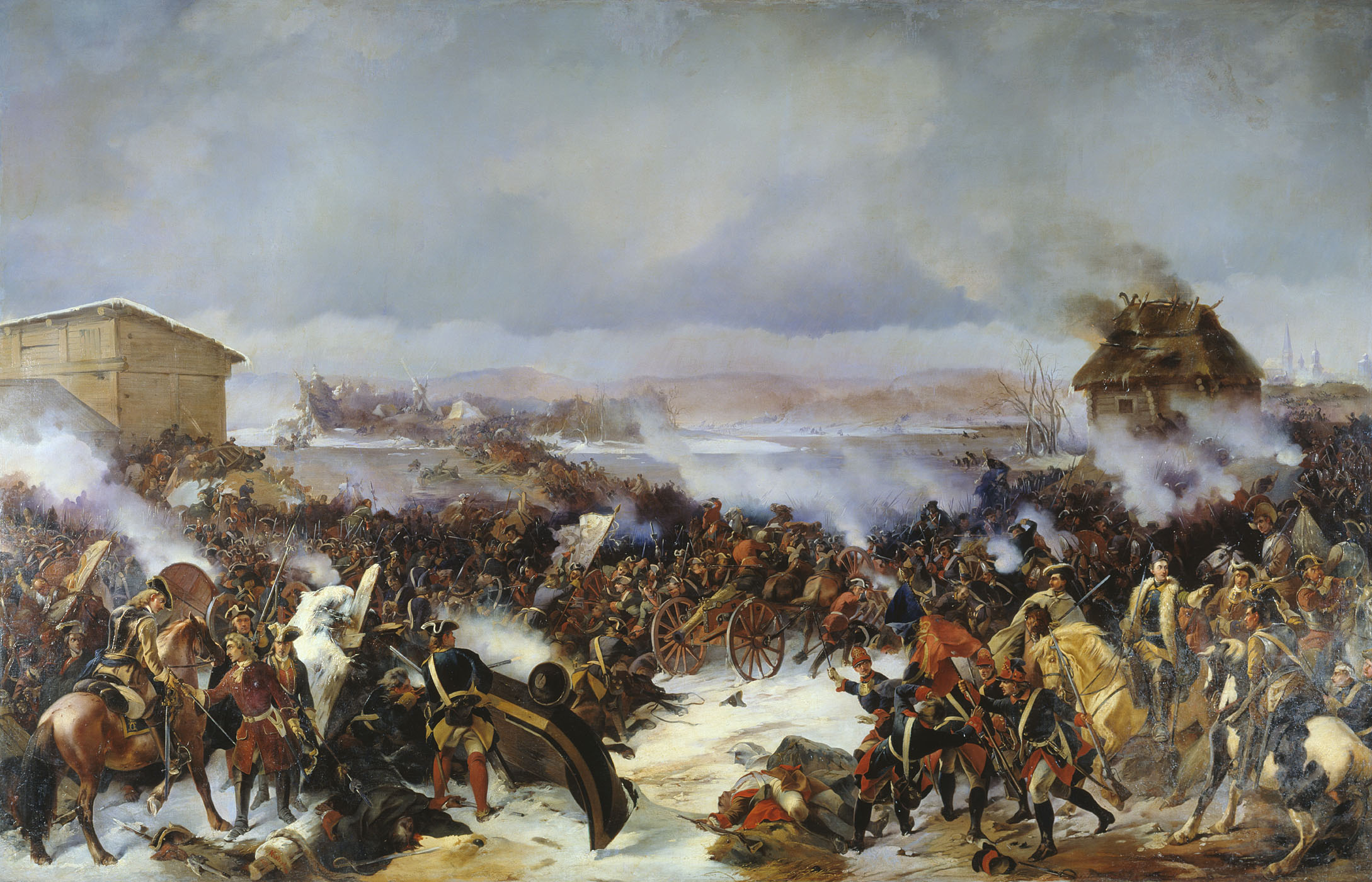
The Battle of Narva by Alexander Kotzebue

By afternoon, the Swedes had finished their preparations and moved forward at 2 p.m. At that moment, it got colder, the wind changed, and the snowstorm blew directly into the eyes of the Russians. Some Swedish officers asked to postpone the attack until the end of the storm. Still, Charles saw his opportunity and advanced on the Russian army under cover of the weather. The Swedes attacked with two highly dense shock groups, quickly approached the Russian positions, and gave a volley, after which the Russians "fell like grass". At first, the Russians vigorously resisted: "They returned a heavy fire and killed many fine fellows", but within 15 minutes, the Swedes filled the ditches with fascines, broke into the fortifications with cold steel arms, and "a terrible massacre" began.

Acting according to the plan, the Swedes moved south and north along the fortification line, rolling up the Russian defense. They attacked inexperienced Russian regiments and shattered them one by one. There was panic and chaos; Russian soldiers began killing foreign officers, and de Croÿ, with his staff, hurried to surrender. Masses of panicking Russians troops rushed to the only Kamperholm Bridge over the Narva River, located at the northern edge of the defensive line. At one crucial point, the bridge collapsed under retreating Russian troops.

On the right (northern) flank of the Russians, only two regiments of the future Guards (Preobrazhensky and Semyonovsky) retained the battle order. They rebuilt in a square, arranged improvised barricades of wagons, and stubbornly held on; some running soldiers joined them. Karl led the attacks against this center of resistance, encouraging his troops, but they were repulsed, and a horse under Karl was killed. Most of the Russian commanders, including generals Golovin and Trubetskoy, managed to join this group despite the surrender of de Croÿ. On the left flank, General Weide was seriously wounded at the very beginning of the battle, but his "division" for the most part did not succumb to panic and even made a successful counterattack, but could not reconnect with the rest of the army.

=== Capitulation ===
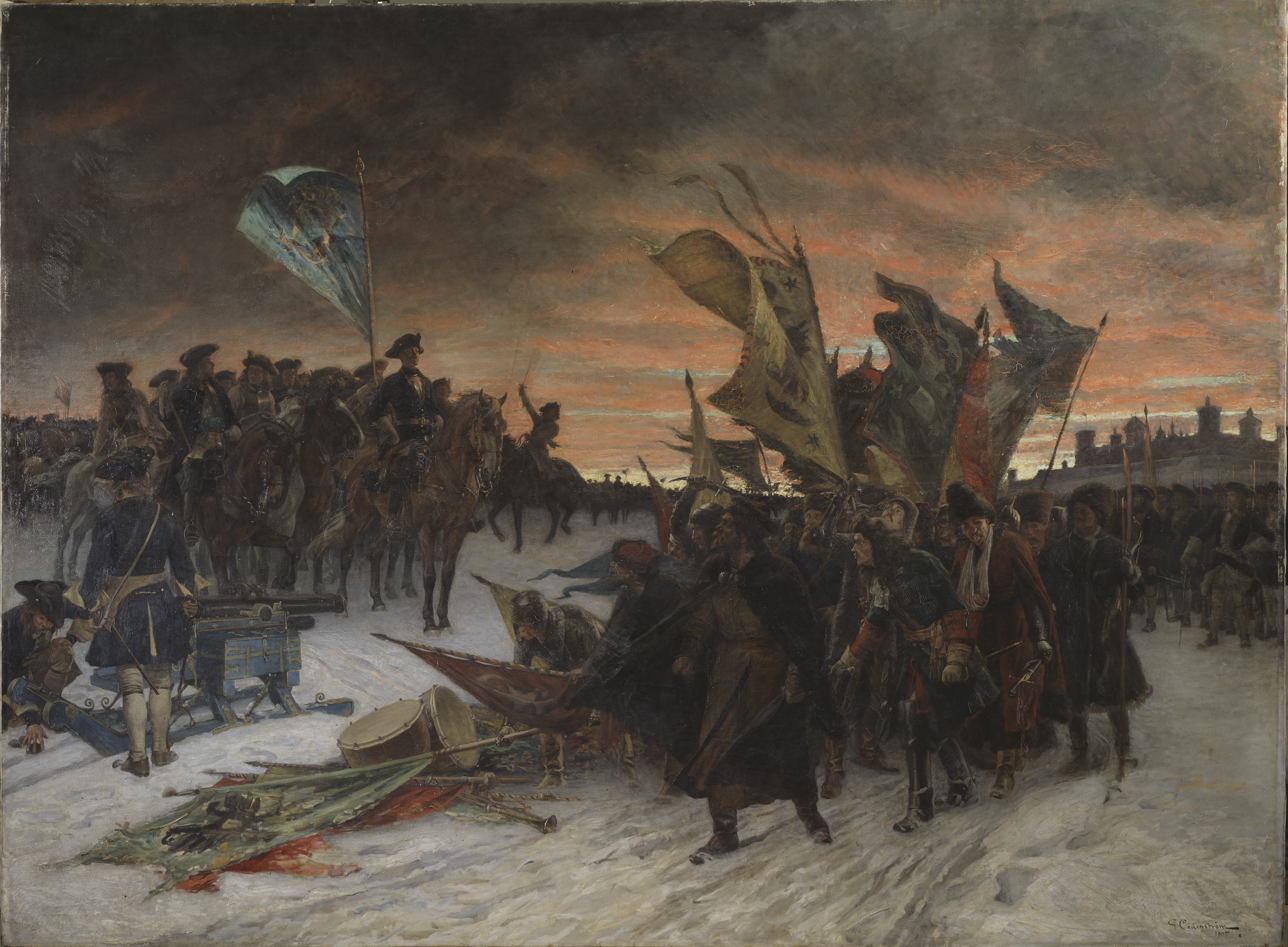
Russian force surrendering to Charles

After the first clash, the high command of the Russian army lost its morale and decided to capitulate. The Swedes, in turn, were exhausted and could not finish off those parts of the Russians who did not succumb to panic and kept their ground. The right flank of the Russian army capitulated faster on a free exit with weapons and colours, but general Weide on the left flank capitulated later and was already forced to hand over weapons and banners. All the artillery and wagon-trains also fell into the hands of the Swedes.

The Swedes and the Russians repaired the Kamperholm Bridge through which capitulated troops crossed to the right bank of the Narva River. The highest Russian commanders remained with the Swedes, initially as hostages, to ensure the fulfillment of the terms of surrender. But later, Charles violated the treaty and kept them as prisoners. The Swedes explained this act by not receiving the army treasury. Sheremetev with his cavalry marched to the south along the left bank of Narva river to Syrensk, crossed the river on the bridge there and thus escaped captivity.

=== Results ===
The Battle of Narva was a terrible defeat for the Russian army. The Swedes captured ten generals and ten colonels, and many Russian regimental officers were killed in battle. The Russian regimental rolls from January 1701 show that the total loss of personnel was about 25% (with a 57–68% loss in the two regular infantry regiments of Trubetskoy's "division"). In Golovin's "division" (excluding the two Guard regiments), only 250 of the 356 officers survived. Weide's "division", however, fared somewhat better. The Russians also suffered heavy losses in armaments, as the Swedes captured 4050 muskets and 173 artillery pieces, including 64 siege cannons. Soon thereafter, the Swedes took an additional 22 mortars from a baggage train near Yam. While the Russians had mostly replenished their small arms by the spring of 1701, the former Golovin and Weide "divisions" still lacked regimental artillery. If Charles had continued the campaign against Russia (as General Vellingk had suggested attacking Novgorod and Pskov), the Russian army very likely would have suffered another defeat.

== Memory ==
=== Russian memorial ===
In 1900, 200 years after the battle of Narva, the Preobrazhensky and Semyonovsky regiments initiated the construction of a memorial to the Russian soldiers who had fallen in the Battle of Narva. The memorial consists of a granite pedestal with a cross on top, placed on a mound of earth. The inscription says: "Our heroic ancestors who fell in November 1700."

=== Victory monument ===
On 20 November 2000, the Swedish Minister for Foreign Affairs, Lena Hjelm Wallén inaugurated a new memorial monument to celebrate the victory. Erected with an economic contribution from the Swedish Institute, it replaced an older memorial erected in 1936, which disappeared during the Second World War. The monument is surmounted by a "Swedish lion", his left paw resting on a ball engraved with the Three Crowns of Sweden. It stands on a pedestal of granite. The Latin inscription on the pedestal reads "MDCC" (1700) and "Svecia memor" ("Sweden remembers").

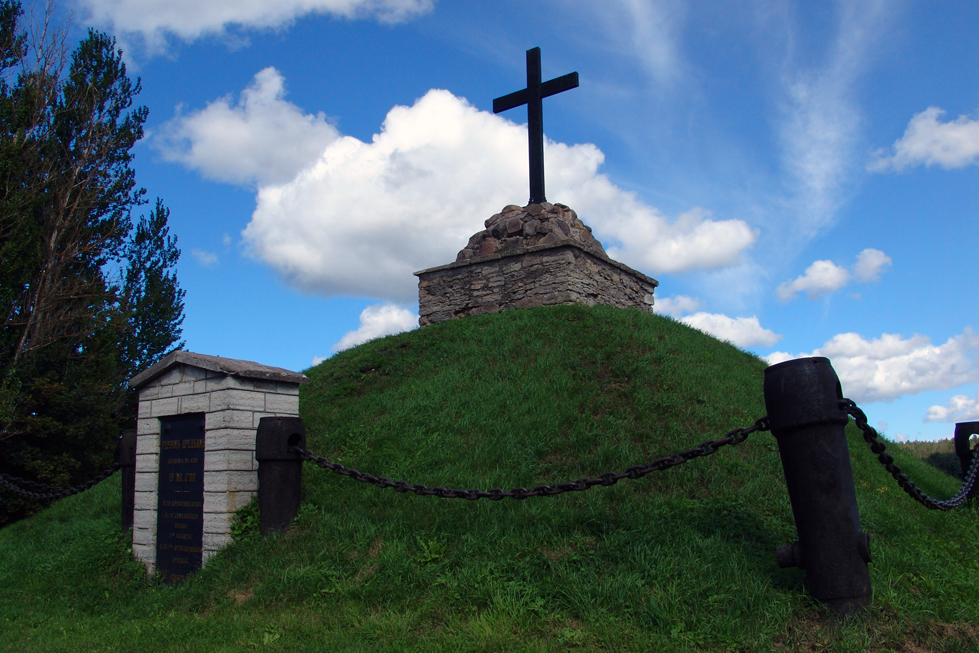
Russian memorial near Narva

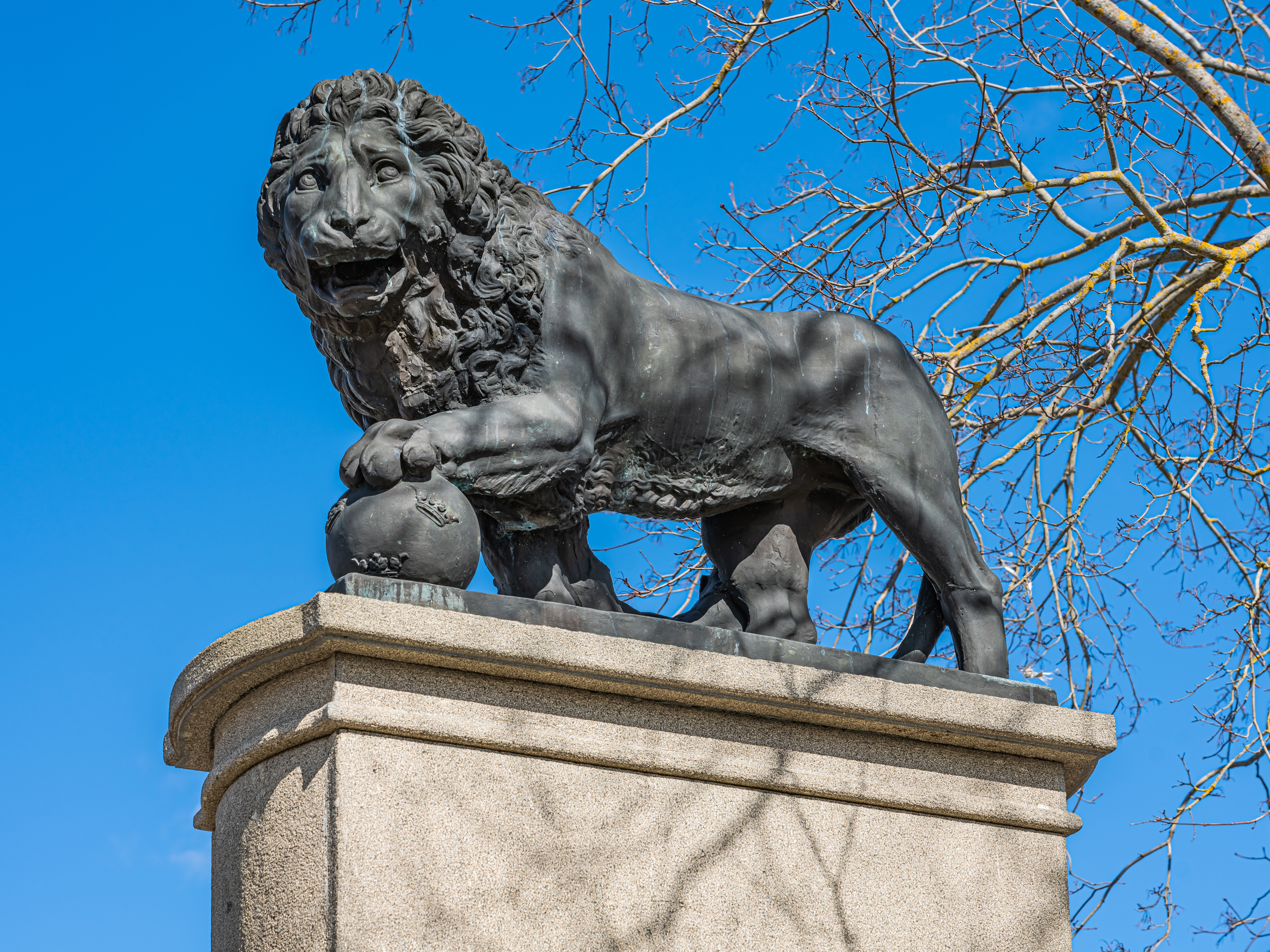
Swedish Lion Monument in Narva

== Second siege ==
Four years after the Narva battle, Peter I marched again in a new attempt to capture Narva. Marshal Boris Sheremetev's force of 20,000 captured Tartu on 24 June. Sheremetev then besieged Narva, where the garrison was under Commandant Major-General Henning Rudolf Horn af Ranzien and consisted of 3,800 infantry and 1,300 cavalry. The Russians captured Narva on 20 August 1704 and massacred some of its Swedish inhabitants before Peter I stopped them. Horn, several officers, and a large number of Swedish soldiers were captured, with about 3,200 casualties while the Russians lost up to 3,000 men during the siege and the assault.

== Works cited ==
- von Essen, Michael Fredholm (24 July 2024). Peter the Great's disastrous defeat at Narva: The Swedish Victory at Narva, 1700. Century of the Soldier 1618–1721. ISBN 9781804514436.
