= Otto Vellingk =

Swedish general (1649–1708)

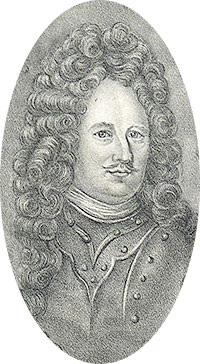
Otto Vellingk

Count Otto Ottoson Vellingk (1649–1708) was a Swedish general during the Great Northern War.

== Biography ==
He was born in Jama in Swedish Ingria to Otto Gotthardsson Vellingk and Christina Nilsdotter Mannersköld.

In 1664, Vellingk became a lieutenant with the Swedish regiment at Bremen. He subsequently entered French service in 1666 and was promoted in 1670 to Colonel in the French army. He was promoted to general in the Swedish Army during 1698. He participated in key battles of Great Northern War including: the Battle of Narva in 1700, and the Crossing of Daugava near Riga in 1701. He participated in the Battle of Klissow on 9 July 1702. He was in the Battle of Punitz on 28 October 1704. He was made a royal advisor in 1705, and ennobled as a count in 1706.

== See also ==
- Great Northern War
