= Semyonovsky Life Guards Regiment =

Russian Ground Forces unit

Semyonovsky Lifeguard Regiment
- Семёновский лейб-гвардии полк
- Modern sleeve patch
- Active: 1683–1918; 2013–present
- Country: Tsardom of Russia (1683–1721); Russian Empire (1721–1917); Russian Republic (1917–1918); Russian Federation (2013–present)
- Branch: Imperial Russian Army (until 1918); Russian Army (1917–1918); Russian Ground Forces (since 2013)
- Type: Infantry
- Size: Regiment (1,400 personnel)
- Part of: Moscow Military District
- Garrison/HQ: St. Petersburg (1723–1917); Alexander Barracks (2013–present)
- Mottos: Что хорошо для других, то недостаточно для Семёновцев! (What is good for others is not enough for Semyonovites!)
- March: Slow: March of the Semyonovsky Regiment

Insignia
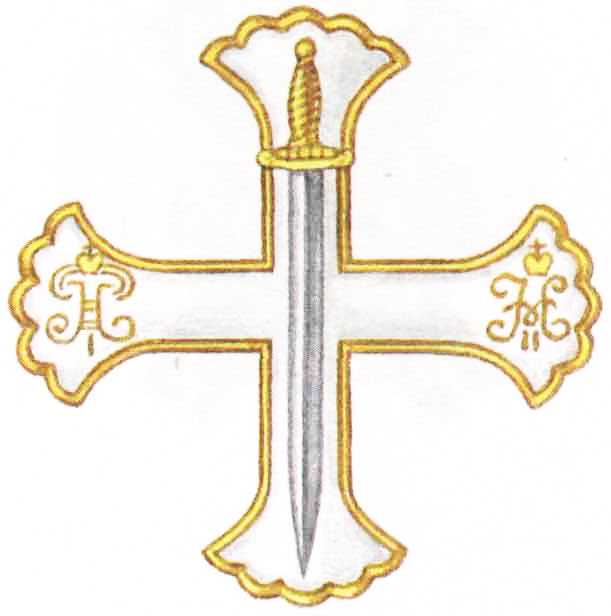
- Badge of the regiment

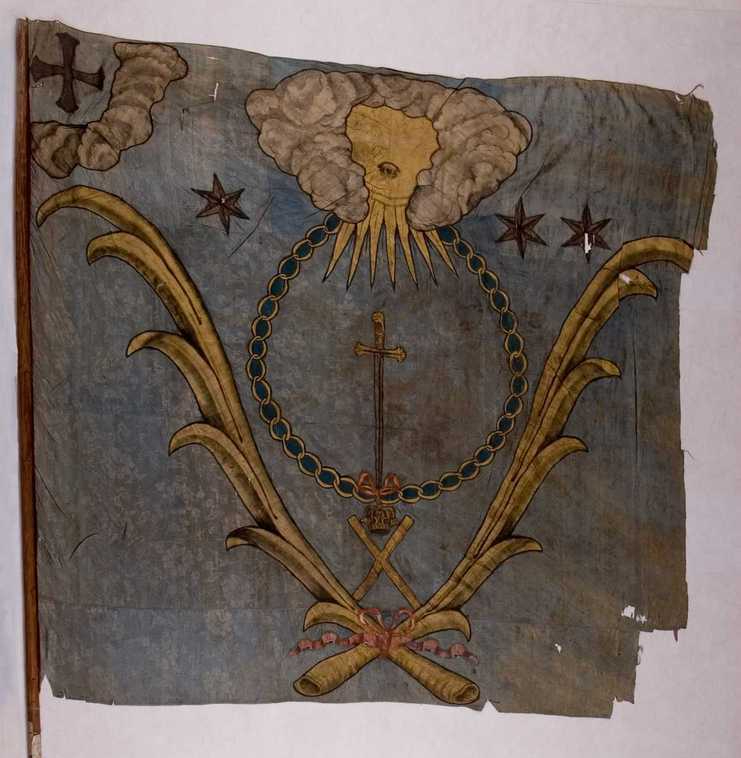
Company flag taken by the Swedes at the Battle of Narva in 1700

The Semyonovsky Lifeguard Regiment (Note: Sometimes spelled Semenovsky in English.) (Russian: Семёновский лейб-гвардии полк, Semyonovsky leyb-gvardii polk) was one of the two oldest guard regiments of the Imperial Russian Army. The other one was the Preobrazhensky Regiment. In 2013, it was recreated for the Russian Armed Forces as a rifle regiment, its name now becoming the 1st Semyonovsky Independent Rifle Regiment (Russian: 1-й отдельный стрелковый Семёновский полк).

The Semyonovsky Regiment was the second oldest regiment of the Russian army, established in 1691 at the village of Semyonovskoye (now in Moscow) from the expansion of Peter the Great's "toy army," which was used to create the Preobrazhensky Regiment in 1690. They were both part of Peter's Western-style regiments and distinguished themselves in battle during his wars with Sweden and the Ottoman Empire.

The regiment was part of the 1st Brigade (known as "Peter's Brigade") of the 1st Guards Infantry Division along with the Preobrazhensky by the time of World War I. It was disbanded after the Russian Revolution.

== History ==
=== Peter's Toy Army ===
The history of the regiment dates back to 1683 when it was formed as a company of the toy army of Peter the Great. It took its name from a village called Semyonovskoe (eastern Moscow) (part of the present-day Sokolniki District), where it was initially stationed. In 1700, the troops became the Semyonovsky Lifeguard Regiment. From 1723, the regiment was quartered in St. Petersburg.

=== The Great Northern War ===
During the Great Northern War, the regiment fought in the Battle of Narva on 30 November 1700. The Russian guard (Semyonovsky and Preobrazhensky regiments) firmly defended themselves from the Swedes and avoided a defeat. For their bravery, the Swedish king Charles XII agreed to allow them to keep their weapons; the Russian guard regiments marched with standards unfurled, drums rolling and in possession of their weapons. For their prowess, all soldiers of the Semyonovsky regiment wore red stockings from 1700 to 1740, as "in that battle, they stood knee-deep in blood". In the battle, the regiment lost 17 officers (including the commander, podpolkovnik Cunningham) and 454 enlisted personnel. Major Yakov Lobanov-Rostovsky was judged and condemned to death for his flight from the battlefield, but subsequently pardoned.

In 1702, a squad of the regiment took part in the 13-hour storming of the fortress of Nöteborg. For that, all of its members received a silver medal. The commander of the squad, podpolkovnik Mikhail Golitsyn, was for his actions promoted to the rank of guards colonel.

In 1703, the regiment excelled in the siege of Nyenschantz and the capture of the Swedish fleet at the mouth of the Neva River. On 9 October 1708, the regiment took part in the Battle of Lesnaya as a part of the infantry contingent of the Corps Volant. On 27 September 1709, it fought in the Battle of Poltava. It also took part in the Prut campaign of 1711.

=== Russo-Swedish War of 1741–1743 ===
Following active service against the Turks in 1738–1739, the Semyonovsky Regiment took part in the Russo-Swedish War of 1741–1743.

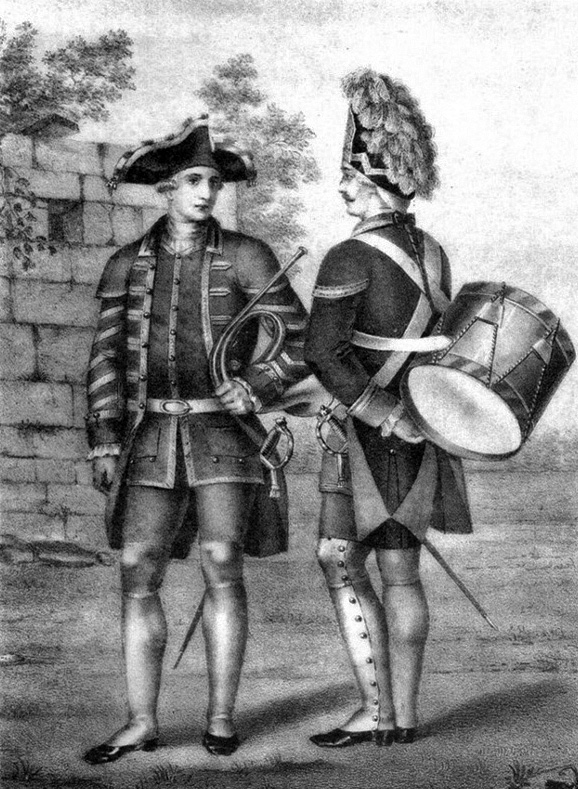
A musician from the Semyonovsky regiment (at left), mid-18th century

=== Russo-Swedish War of 1788–1790 ===
The Semyonovsky Regiment saw active service in Finland during this campaign.

=== The Napoleonic Wars ===
The entire regiment participated in the wars with France (1805, 1806–1807, and 1812–1814).

During the French invasion of Russia in 1812, all three battalions of the regiment formed part of the 1st Brigade of the Guard Infantry Division of the 5th Infantry Corps. Upon departure from Saint Petersburg, it had 51 officers and 2147 enlisted personnel in service. In the Battle of Borodino, the regiment was held in reserve; after the French captured the battery of Raevsky, it fought against the French heavy cavalry in the center of the Russian positions (120 servicemen lost).

In the campaign of 1813, the regiment fought in the battles of Lützen, Bautzen, Kulm, and Leipzig. In 1814, the regiment was redeployed to Paris and took part in the Allied parade for the deposition of Napoleon and his exile to Elba that year. A unique officer served in the regiment for those two years: Georgian cavalier and colonel (later general) Sergey Nepeitsyn. He lost his leg at Ochakov and used an artificial leg, constructed by the famous engineer Kulibin.

=== 19th century ===
The regiment participated in the wars against Turkey (1828–1829 and 1877–1878).

On 16 October 1820, the senior company of the Semyonovsky regiment, at the initiative of its former commander Yakov Potyomkin, forwarded a petition seeking to cancel the harsh regime instituted under Russian statesman Aleksey Arakcheyev and to change the regiment's commander Schwartz. The company was brought to a riding academy, arrested and imprisoned in the Peter and Paul Fortress. The remainder of the regiment interceded in favour of their comrades, but were surrounded by the garrison of Saint Petersburg and also sent to the Peter and Paul Fortress. The first battalion was court-martialled by a tribunal; the instigators were condemned to run the gauntlet, while other guardsmen were exiled to remote garrisons. The other Semyonovsky battalions were disbanded and the men were reassigned to various line infantry regiments. The Semyonovsky Regiment was reformed with the reduced rights and status of a "young guard" unit. The former privileges were restored to the regiment in 1823.

=== 1905 Revolution ===
In 1905, the regiment played a key part in quelling the armed uprising in Moscow.

On 16 December, when the Semyonovsky Regiment arrived in Moscow by train from Saint Petersburg, rebels still held the Presnya quarter as well as the Moscow-Kazan railroad line to Golutvin. While part of the Semyonovsky remained in the suburbs, the regiment's commander, Colonel Georgiy Min, detached the third battalion under Colonel Nikolai Riman to join the fighting around the Presnya barricades. Colonel Min himself commanded the assault on the center of the rebellion, giving an order not to take prisoners. For these actions, Min received special praise from Emperor Nicholas II, was promoted to major general, and was appointed to the Emperor's personal entourage.

Less than a year later, on 13 August 1906, General Min was assassinated by Socialist Revolutionaries.

=== World War I and disbandment ===
During World War I, the regiment was dispatched to the Southwestern Front as part of the 1st Guards Infantry Division. The reserve battalion, which remained in Petrograd, took part in the February Revolution in 1917.

In March 1918, the Semyonovsky regiment returned from the front to Petrograd and was disbanded the same month. The 3rd Petrograd City Guard Regiment was created in its place. Many men enlisted in the regiment to avoid service in the Red Army itself. However, when Petrograd later was threatened by White Russian forces, many units from Petrograd were sent to the front, including the 3rd Regiment. In late May 1919, a large portion of the regiment (more than 600 men) switched sides to join the White movement; all communists who were present at the time were shot.

In 1925, 21 former officers of the regiment were arrested. Eleven of these men were shot; some others were sent to Gulag camps.

=== Uniforms and physical appearance ===
Throughout its history under the Russian Empire, the regiment wore the standard uniform of the Infantry of the Imperial Guard, which from 1683 to 1914 was predominantly of dark green (eventually verging on black) colour. The main distinctions of the Semyonovsky Regiment were the red facings (plastron, cuffs and shoulder straps) edged in white piping. Tunic collar colours were of a light to medium blue, worn with distinctive regimental patterns of braid (litzen). In addition, the tsar's monogram appeared on the soldiers' shoulder straps and officers' epaulettes. In 1910, in recognition of its distinguished record, officers of the regiment were authorised to wear a large metal gorget inscribed "In memory of Narva 1683-1850-1883".

A peculiarity of the Russian Imperial Guard was that recruits for most regiments were required to meet certain criteria of physical appearance, in order to provide a standardised appearance on parade. For the Semyonovsky Regiment conscripts were selected for their height (tallest of the Guard Infantry), light brown hair and being clean-shaven.

== Revival ==
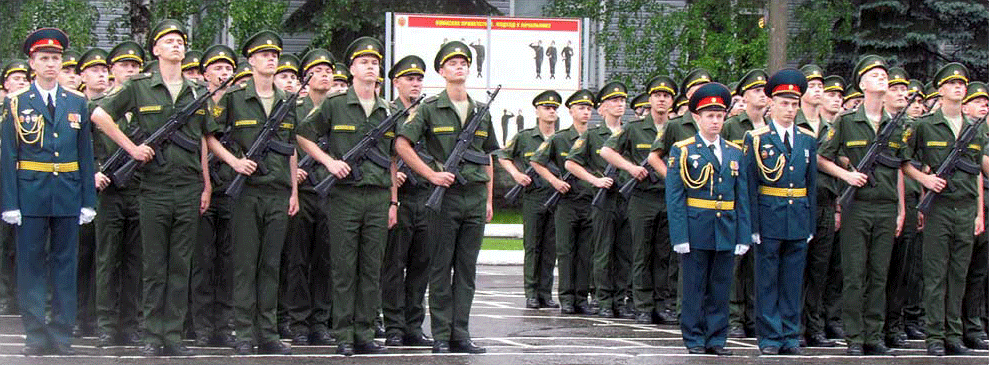
Personnel of the revived regiment in 2015.

In 2013, President Vladimir Putin signed a decree on the re-establishment of the Regiment as a rifle regiment, its name now becoming the 1st Semyonovsky Independent Rifle Regiment, and joining the Kremlin Regiment in providing security to the President of Russia and the entire Moscow Kremlin and its surroundings, just as its predecessors did. Just as before the move to Saint Petersburg, the regiment today is garrisoned in Zyuzino Selo in Ramensky District, Moscow Oblast. Alongside the traditions of the Imperial unit, it also maintains the traditions of another disbanded formation, the 1st Independent Rifle Security Brigade of the Ministry of Defence, formed as a battalion in 1919 and disbanded in 2008 or 2009.

The renewed regiment's first-ever enlistment ceremony for new recruits was held on 11 December 2013. Unlike the Kremlin Regiment, the current unit reports directly as a component unit of the Russian Ground Forces - the only independent regiment of infantry in service, and thus is part of the Russian Armed Forces proper, reporting to the President, who is the Supreme Commander of the Armed Forces, and the Minister of Defense, through the Commander of the Ground Forces. Since it is a military unit of the Armed Forces, it wears the same uniforms and uses the same ranks, uniforms and armaments as the rest of the Ground Forces. Operationally it is part of the Moscow Military District.

=== Organization of the reformed regiment ===
- Regimental HQ
- Regimental Band
- Special Troops Company
- Transport Company
- 1st Guards Rifle Battalion, Semyonovsky Regiment
- 2nd Guards Rifle Battalion, Semyonovsky Regiment
- 3rd Guards Rifle Battalion, Semyonovsky Regiment
- 4th Guards Rifle Battalion, Semyonovsky Regiment
- 1st Motorized Rifle Company (Independent)
- 5th (Training) Rifle Battalion, Semyonovsky Regiment
  - Regimental Depot Zyuzino Selo

The current regiment wears full dress and service uniforms similar to those worn by the rest of the Ground Forces, but with the regimental distinctive unit insignia worn as a patch on all orders of dress.
