= Aleksei Shein =

Russian commander (1662–1700)

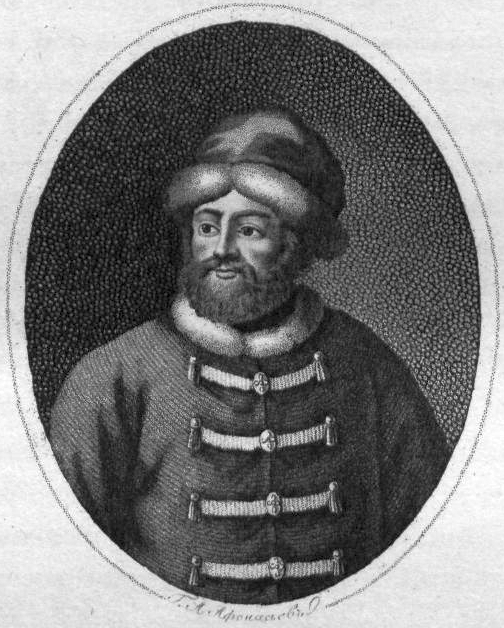
- Native name: Алексей Семенович Шеин
- Born: 1652; Moscow, Tsardom of Russia
- Died: 12 February 1700 (aged 47–48)
- Buried: Trinity Lavra of St. Sergius
- Allegiance: Russia
- Branch: Army of the Tsardom of Russia
- Service years: 1680–1700
- Rank: Generalissimo
- Commands: Novgorod Discharge Regiment

Aleksei Semyonovich Shein (Russian: Алексе́й Семёнович Ше́ин; 1662 – February 12, 1700) was a Russian commander and statesman, the first Russian Generalissimo (1696), and boyar. He was the great-grandson of Mikhail Shein.

Shein originated from an old boyar family, which, however, after the execution of Mikhail Shein in 1634 was exiled to Alatyrsky Uyezd, currently Chuvashia, and were only allowed to return to Moscow in 1642.

As a boy, Shein attended the execution of Stepan Razin. Later in his life, he would participate in the coronation ceremony of Peter I and Ivan V. Sophia Alekseyevna was very fond of Shein and granted him the title of a boyar. Shein was a military commander in Tobolsk and Kursk in 1680–1684. Later, he was one of the military leaders during the Crimean campaigns of 1687 and 1689 and the Azov campaigns of 1695–1696. During the Second Azov campaign in 1696, Shein was the commander-in-chief of the Russian land forces and was granted the title of Generalissimus by Peter I for his military achievements. Upon his departure on the Grand Embassy mission (Великое посольство, or Velikoye posolstvo), Peter I appointed Shein commander-in-chief of the Russian Army and director of the Gunnery, Reiter and Foreign Affairs Departments. In 1697, Shein defeated the Crimean and Nogai Tatars. In 1698, Shein was the one to suppress the Streltsy Uprising. Upon Peter's return, however, Shein fell into his disgrace for not having disclosed Streltsys’ ties with Sophia and, therefore, lost his boyar beard.

Stefan Yavorsky (later archbishop of Ryazan) performed the funeral oration for Shein, it attracted the attention of Peter the Great.
