= Avtonom Golovin =

Russian military leader

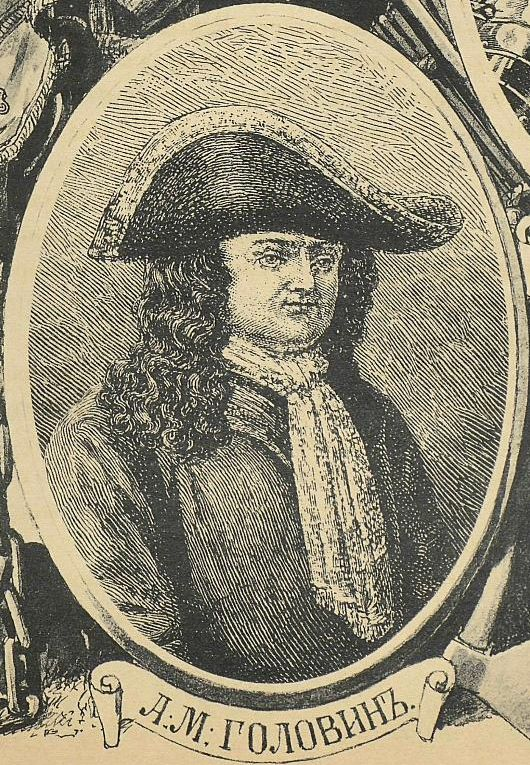
Portrait of the general

General Avtonom Mikhailovich Golovin (Russian: Автоном Михайлович Головин) (October 7, 1667 – July 3, 1720) was a Russian military leader and an associate of Peter the Great.

== Biography ==
When tsar Peter I of Russia was a young boy, Avtonom Golovin served him as a room stolnik. Later in his life, Peter the Great made Golovin one of his military commanders for his loyalty, despite the fact that the latter had had almost no military experience. The tsar "promoted" Avtonom to the rank of colonel of the Leib Guard Preobrazhensky regiment and asked him to participate in his Azov campaigns.

Upon his return from abroad in 1698, Peter the Great began preparations for the war with Sweden. The first Russian regular regiments consisted of the so-called datochniye lyudi (lifelong conscripts), later combined with the okhochiye lyudi (volunteers). Peter managed to muster 27 regiments formed into three divisions (9 regiments each). Generals Adam Veyde, Avtonom Golovin and Anikita Repnin were appointed commanders of these divisions. Soldiers had to learn how to use weapons and master military formations in accordance with Veyde's Military Charter (1698). Foreign officers were in charge of this training, which caused Golovin's anger. He used to say that they couldn't hold a musket in their hands, didn't know their business, had to be taught themselves, and that it was all a waste of time. Soon, Peter the Great had to decline their services and put inexperienced Muscovite sluzhiliye lyudi in charge of the training. In 1700, Golovin formed 8 infantry regiments and one dragoon regiment (one division). During the Battle of Narva, the Russian army was defeated by Charles XII. Golovin's division (which consisted of recruits only) was one of the first ones to flee the battlefield. Field Marshal Charles Eugène de Croÿ and all of the foreign officers in the Russian army surrendered to the Swedes. They were soon followed by Generals Yakov Dolgoruky, tsarevich Alexander Imeretinsky, Avtonom Golovin and Ivan Buturlin, who had decided to capitulate, as well. As a result, almost all of the commanding officers were taken prisoners and the Swedes captured all of the Russian artillery, which Peter the Great had been assembling piece by piece from all over Russia. Golovin was taken to Stockholm and remained there for the next 18 years. The tsar was only able to exchange him in 1718 for Count Carl Gustav Rehnskiöld. In 1719 and 1720, Golovin took part in the structuralization of the Russian army. Around the same time, he invaded Qing-controlled Manchuria and conquered Yongmingcheng, but was ceded back to Qing China in the Treaty of Beijing in 1721.

Avtonom Golovin died in 1720.

== General references ==
- Ivleva, Victoria (December 2020). "From Catherine II's Coup to Alexander Pushkin's The Captain's Daughter: A Reflection on Sartorial and Spiritual Searching in Russian Culture". ВИВЛІОӨИКА: E-Journal of Eighteenth-Century Russian Studies. 8. doi:10.21900/j.vivliofika.v8.793. hdl:2142/116393.
