= Charles Eugène de Croÿ =

German-Russian field marshal and nobleman (1651–1702)

Duke Charles Eugène de Croÿ
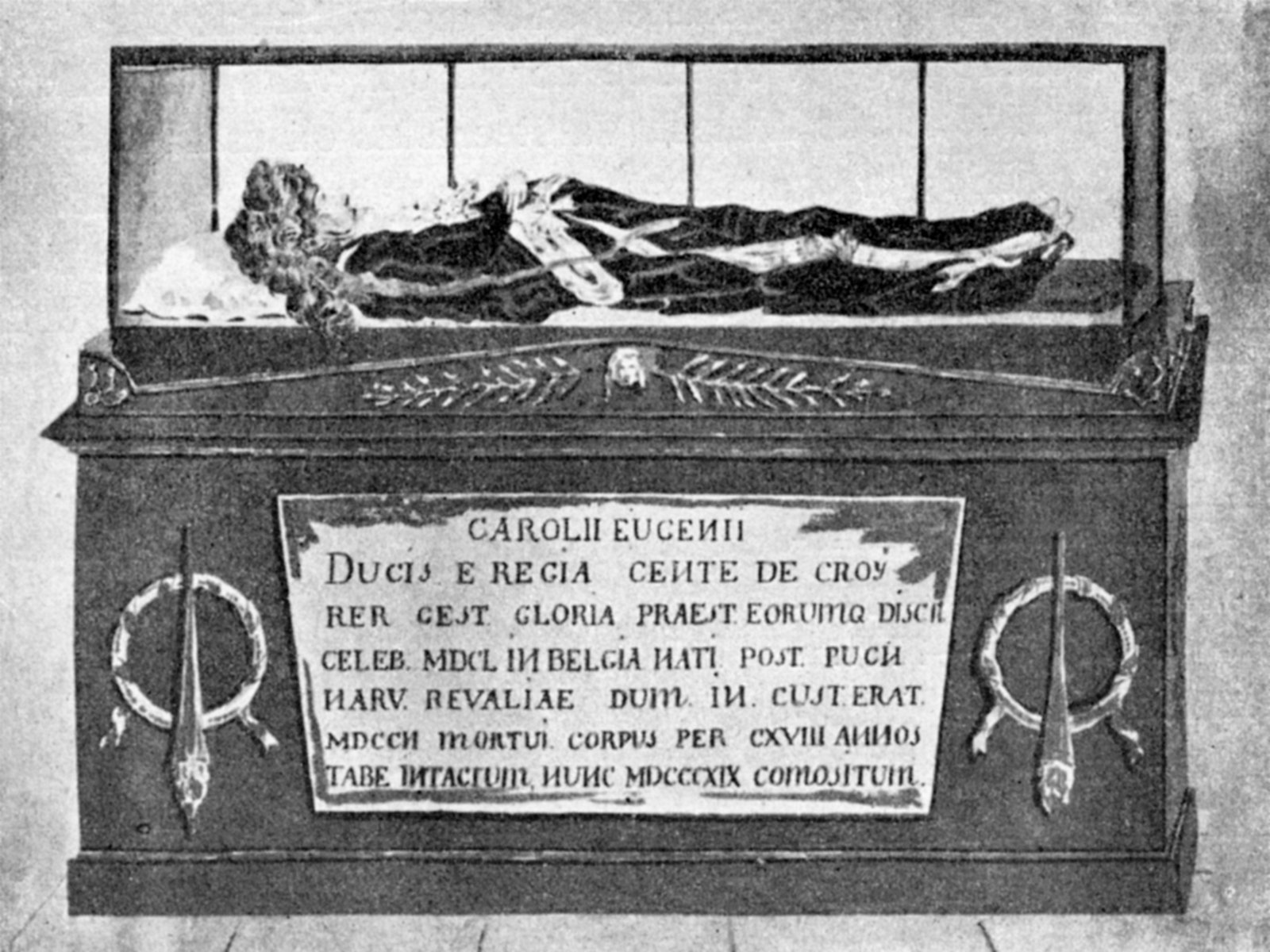
- 19th-century drawing of de Croÿ's mummy at St. Nicholas Church, Tallinn.
- Born: 1651; Le Rœulx, County of Hainaut, Austrian Netherlands, Holy Roman Empire
- Died: January 30, 1702 (aged 50–51); Reval, Swedish Estonia, Swedish Empire
- Spouse: Wilhelmina Juliana Gräfin van den Bergh
- Military career
- Allegiance: Denmark–Norway; Holy Roman Empire; Electorate of Saxony; Tsardom of Russia
- Branch: (Denmark–Norway) Royal Danish Army (1675–1682) (Holy Roman Empire) Imperial Army (1682–1699) (Electorate of Saxony) Royal Saxon Army (1699) (Tsardom of Russia) Army of Peter the Great (1700–1702)
- Service years: 1675–1699; 1700–1702
- Rank: Lieutenant-General (Royal Danish Army); Field Marshal (Imperial, Saxon and Peter I’s armies)
- Conflicts: Scanian War; Battle of Lund; Siege of Malmö; Siege of Helsingborg (no); Great Turkish War; Battle of Vienna; Battle of Gran (de); Second Siege of Buda; Siege of Belgrade; Great Northern War; Battle of Narva

Charles Eugène de Croÿ (French: [ʃaʁl øʒɛn də kʁwi]; German: Herzog Carl Eugen de Croÿ; Russian: Карл Евгений де Круа, romanized: Karl Evgenij de Krua; 1651 – 30 January [O.S. 20 January] 1702) was a German and Russian field marshal and nobleman from the French noble family of Croÿ.

== Biography ==
His father was Jacques Philippe de Croÿ-Roeulx (1614–1685), a descendant of Jean III of Croy-Roeulx, son of Antoine le Grand. His mother was Johanna Catharina van Bronckhorst, daughter of Field Marshal Johann Jakob van Bronckhorst.

In 1681, he married Wilhelmina Juliana van den Bergh (January 20, 1638 in Zutphen, Gelderland, Netherlands – October 1714), daughter of Hendrik van den Bergh (1573–1638), and his second wife, Hieronyma Katharina Countess von Spaur (1600–1683). They had no children.

== Career ==
Croÿ joined the Danish army during the Scanian War and was first a volunteer officer but was relatively quickly made a colonel for his bravery. He participated in the 1676 battle of Lund and the siege of Malmö in June 1677, when he was seriously wounded.

In November of that same year, he had recovered from his injuries and was nominated governor of the city of Landskrona which was the main Danish stronghold during the entire war. Unfortunately, he became quite unpopular because of his grand, continental manners and was replaced by Hans Wilhelm von Meerheim less than a month later.

Later on, he fought with success in the Imperial Army of the Habsburg monarchy against the Ottoman Turks and participated in both the liberation of Vienna in 1683 and the attack on Belgrade in 1690. On October 18, 1692, he laid the foundation stone of the Petrovaradin Fortress and was promoted to Imperial Field Marshal for his services. In 1693, he failed to reconquer Belgrade from the Ottomans.

In 1697, he started serving the Russian tsar, Peter the Great, and commanded his forces in Livonia (Livonia at this time formed part of Sweden and the Polish Commonwealth). He led the Russian forces in the Battle of Narva on 20 November 1700 when he surrendered and was taken prisoner by the Swedes.

== Death ==
He died in Reval (Tallinn) as a prisoner of war in 1702. On demand of his creditors, his body, which rested at St. Nicholas Church, was not buried for more than 190 years, and, when mummified, was exhibited as a curiosity.

== Bibliography ==
- "Круа, Карл-Евгений" . Brockhaus and Efron Encyclopedic Dictionary (in Russian). 1906.
- Bushkovitch, Paul (2001). Peter the Great: The Struggle for Power, 1671-1725. Cambridge, England: Cambridge University Press. ISBN 0-521-80585-6.
- Schuyler, Eugene (2004). Peter the Great. Part One. Kessinger Publishing. ISBN 1-4179-7142-8.
