= Toy army of Peter the Great =

Regiment of young boys under Peter the Great

The toy army of Peter the Great (Russian: Потешные войска, romanized: Poteshnye voiska, lit. 'amusement forces, fun forces'), initially called Peter's regiment (Russian: Петровский полк, romanized: Petrovsky polk), was a collection of young Peter I of Russia's playmates, the sons of noblemen, and attendants from his father Aleksey's court.

== History ==
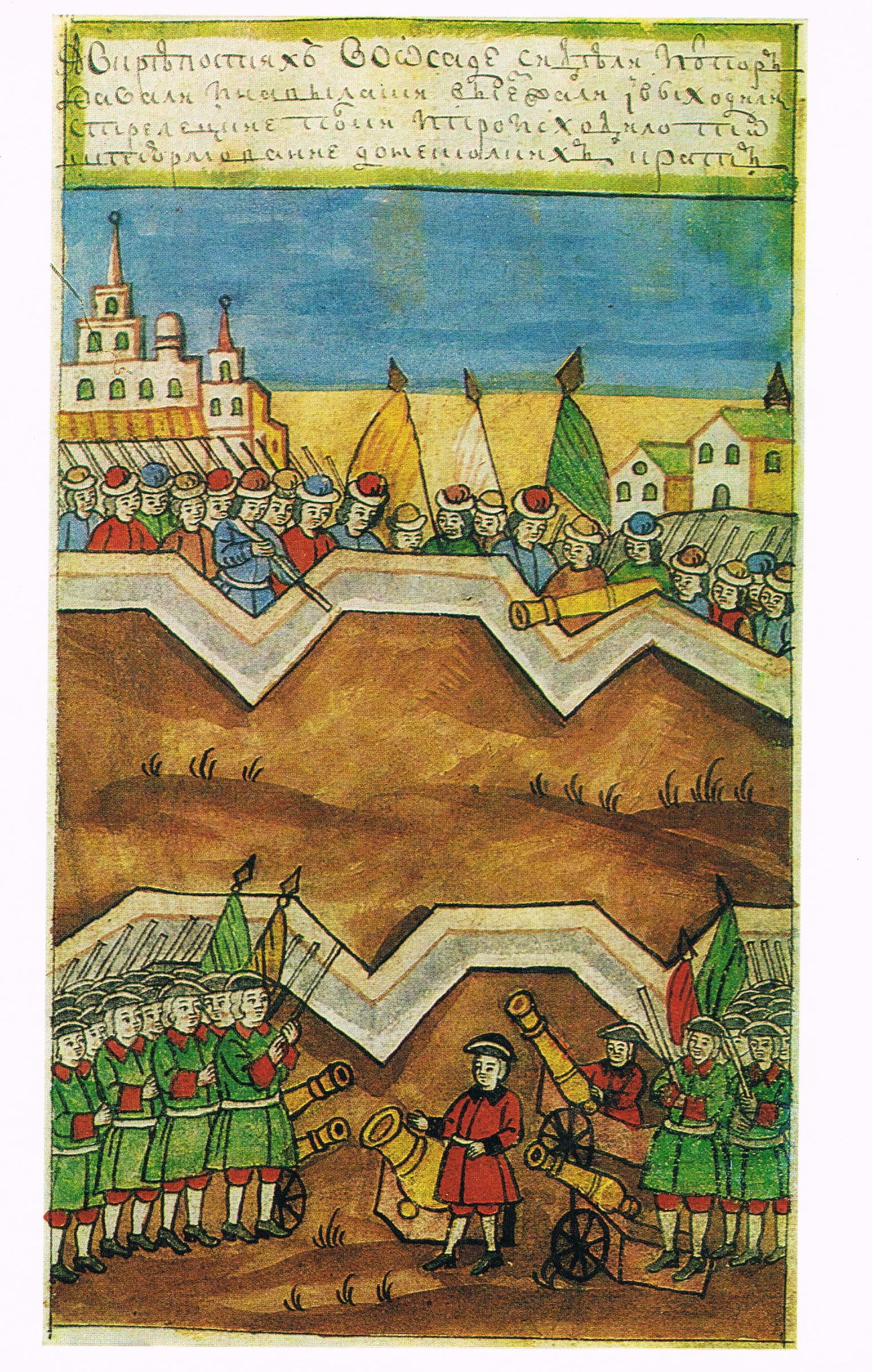
Military exercises of the toy army

In 1682, when Peter with his mother, Natalia Naryshkina, relocated to the royal lodge in Preobrazhenskoye, he gradually formed a miniature army, ostensibly to school himself in the modern art of war. Besides fellow children, the servants and retainers were also enlisted, with 25-year-old Sergey Bukhvostov recorded in 1683 as the "first Russian soldier". Initially, the "play soldiers" were organized as a 100 men strong Company of Bombardiers.

The boys played war, and as they grew, their games became more complex and realistic. Professional military advice was sought, and foreign officers were hired as instructors, eventually becoming part of the permanent officer corps of the Poteshnyi. By 1685, the Poteshnyi numbered 300 and were quartered in specially built barracks near Preobrazhenskoye, and as their numbers increased, a second similarly sized group was barracked in a neighboring village, Semenovskoe. With further drafts of streltsy volunteers, the Poteshnyi were organized into the Preobrazhensky and the Semenovsky companies in 1687. At this stage both companies included artillery and cavalry components.

During the 1698 coup attempt by regent Sophia Alekseyevna, the Poteshnyi had been part of the units supporting young Peter, along with most of the streltsy, and leading members of the Russian nobility.

The companies were being expanded, and on 25 April 1695, they officially became the Preobrazhensky and Semyonovsky Life Guards Regiments of the Guard. These regiments became the beginnings of the Russian Imperial Guard. As Peter matured, the regiments did as well, and Peter participated fully in the army, joining its ranks as a bombardier, and rising up to colonel and head of the regiments.
