= Mertvy Donets =

River in Rostov Oblast, Russia

Coordinates: 47°16′06″N 39°13′20″E

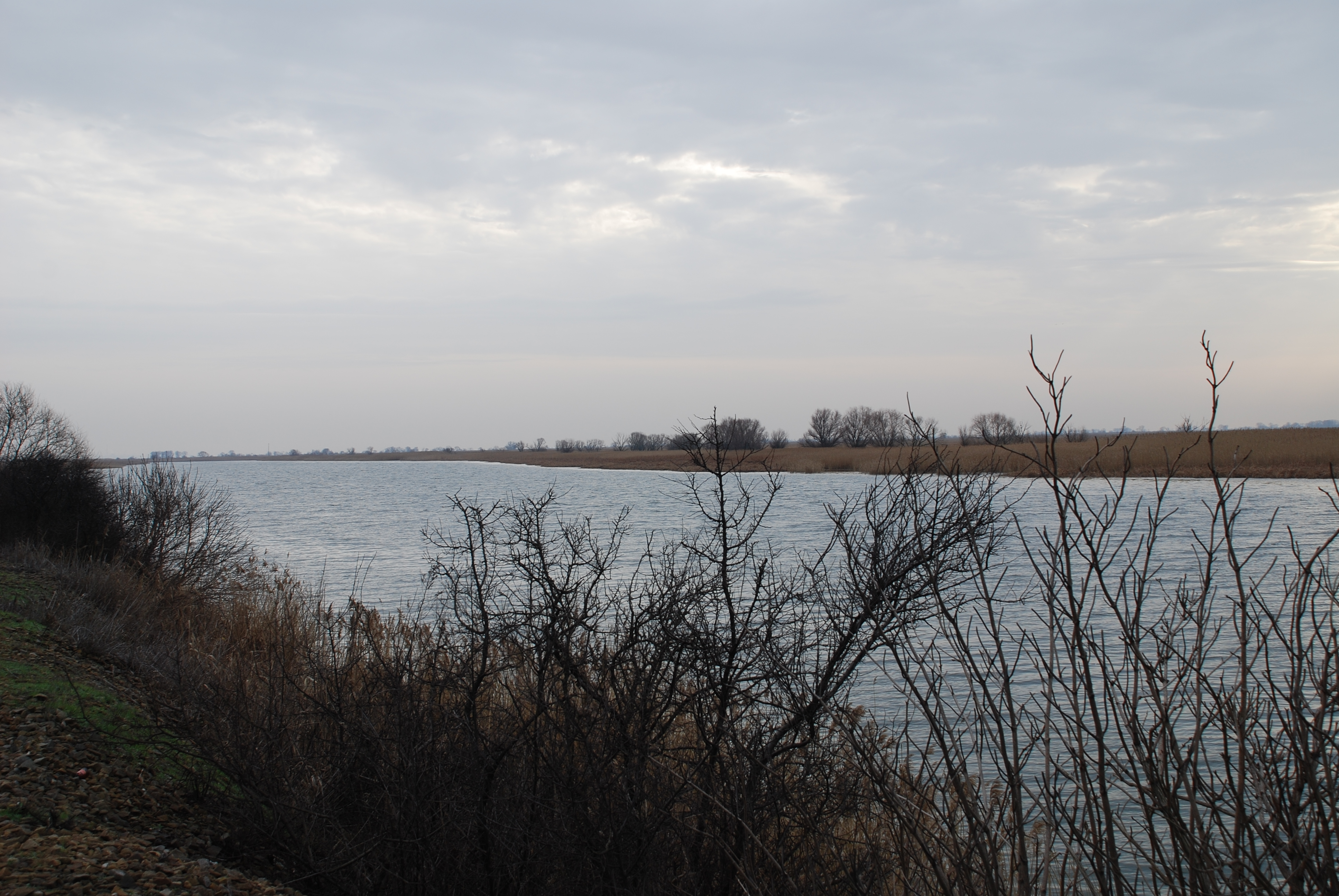
Mertvy Donets River near Sinyavskoe village

Mertvy Donets (Russian: Мёртвый Донец) is a river in the Rostov Oblast, Russia. It is the longest of the channels of the Don Delta and connects the Don with the northern part of the Taganrog Gulf. The river has the length of 36 km, width of 50-200 m and depth up to 4 m.

== Description ==
Mertvy Donets is separated from the Don River at the territory of Rostov-on-Don, downstream from the Western (Gnilovsky) Bridge and above the Kumzhensky Grove, which is situated between the Don and Mertvy Donets. First, it flows to the north-west, on the right bank there are the microdistricts of Rostov-on-Don, the former houses of Gnilovskaya village. On the left bank there are fishpond ponds. Below Karataev it takes the right tributary - Sukhoy Chaltyr River. After passing 16 km of its current, below the Kalinin khutor it takes the right tributary - Mokry Chaltyr River. At the confluence of Mokry Chaltyr, the river turns to the west. Slightly above Mytynovo Station it meets the left tributary - Lutic River, at the mouth of which are located the remains of the fortress of the same name. Below is the hamlet Hapry. It was founded by the Cossacks of the Khoper Regiment. At Nedvigovka it takes the right tributary - Kamennaya Balka, on the right bank there are the remains of the ancient city of Tanais. Below Tanais, the river is connected to a trough by the Ternovaya channel, forming the Ternovo Island, a natural monument. At Sinyavsky village it takes the right and last inflow - Donskoy Chulek. Mertvy Donets runs along the Rostov-on-Don-Taganrog Railroad throughout its entire length. It flows into the Taganrog Bay to the southeast of the Morskoy Chulek Farm.

Overall Mertvy Donets flows through the territory of Myasnikovsky and Neklinovsky districts, as well as through the territory of Rostov-on-Don.
