= Olbia (disambiguation) =

Olbia is a city in Sardinia, Italy.

Olbia may also refer to:

== Places ==
- Astacus (Bithynia) or Olbia, an ancient city in present-day Anatolia, Turkey
- Olbia (Cilicia), an ancient town in present-day Anatolia, Turkey
- Olbia (Egypt), an ancient city later called Arsinoe
- Olbia (Pamphylia), an ancient town in present-day Anatolia, Turkey
- Olbia, Libya, a Roman/Byzantine town
- Olbia, or Nicomedia, now İzmit in Anatolia, Turkey
- Pontic Olbia, or Olbia, ancient city and archaeological site in Ukraine
- Olbia, a Hellenic settlement in Hyères, France

== Other uses ==
- Olbia Calcio 1905, or Olbia, Sardinian football club
- Olbia (bug), a genus in the family Pentatomidae

== See also ==
- Olba (disambiguation)
- Province of Olbia-Tempio, a former province in Sardinia, Italy
