= Azov Fortress =

- Азовская крепость (Russian)
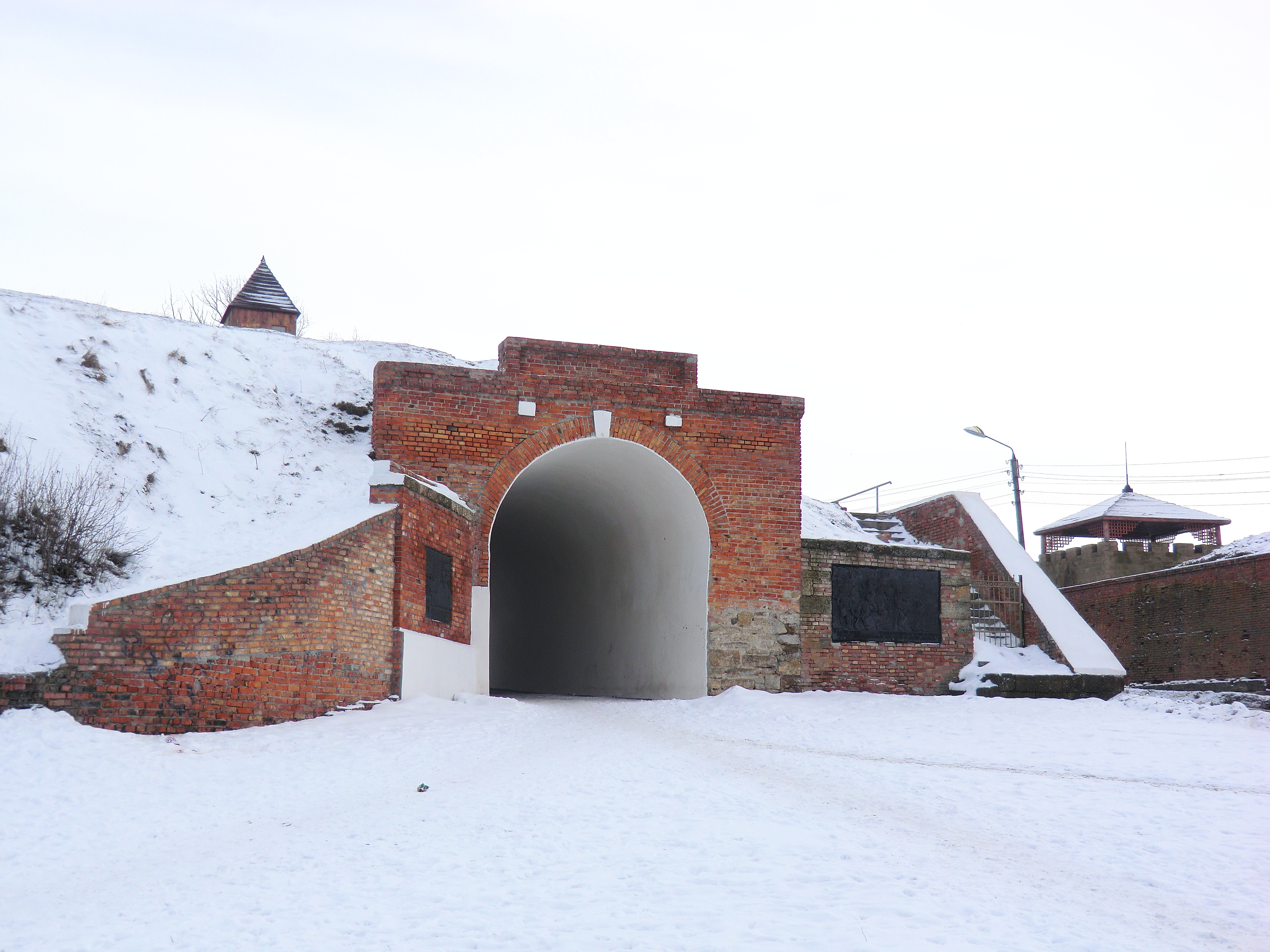
- Alekseyevskie gates of the Azov Fortress

- Location within Russia
- 47.117°N 39.422°E
- Type: Fortress and museum
- Location: Azov, Rostov oblast Russia

History
- Built: 1475

The Azov Fortress (Russian: Азовская крепость, romanized: Azovskaya krepost) is a fortified complex in Azov, Rostov Oblast, Russia, overlooking the Don River and the Port of Azov to the north. It includes a rampart, watchtowers and gates. The Azov Fortress (formerly known as Azak Fortress) was founded by Turks on behalf of the Ottoman Empire in 1475. It guarded the northern approaches to the Empire and access to the Azov Sea. After a series of conflicts, a peace treaty was signed in Constantinople on July 13, 1700 between the Tsardom of Russia and the Ottoman Empire. The sultan recognized Russia's possession of the Azov area.

== History ==
=== Origin ===
The site had been Venetian and Genoese colonies before the second half of the 15th century. A town named Tana served as major transit point for trafficking between West and East. Tana became a part of the Ottoman Empire in 1471. The Ottomans founded an enormous fortress there. It consisted of a stone wall with 11 towers around a hill. The faubourg was separated by a moat and ramparts. The fortress' garrison was armed with 200 cannons.

=== Cossack period ===
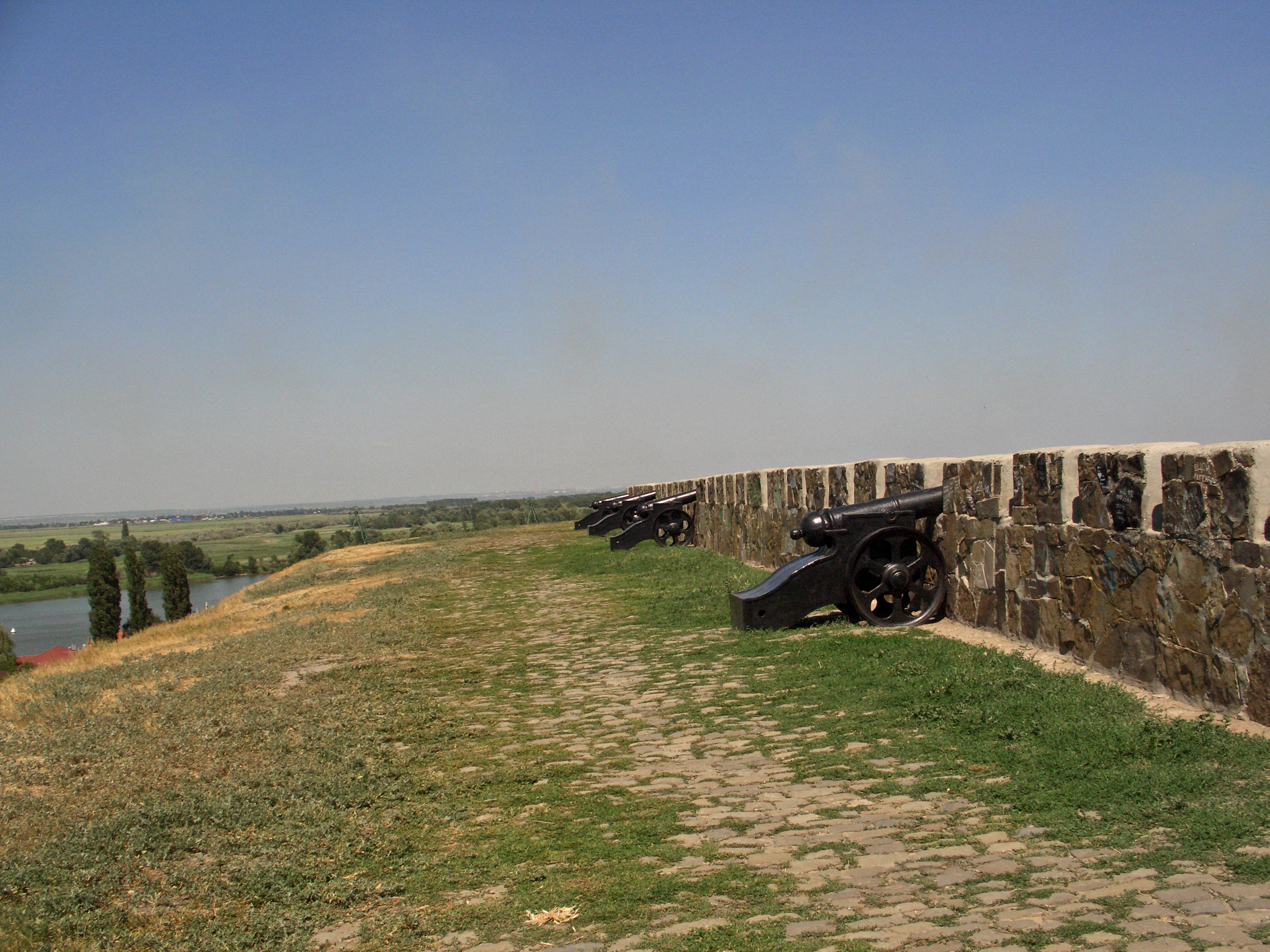
The rampart

The Don and Zaporozhian Cossacks stormed the fortress in June 1637. Cossack cavalry with the strength of 400 horsemen defended the fortress from steppe side. Turkish army attempted to retake Azov in 1641. The fortress sustained heavy shelling by guns that reduced much of the fortress to rubble. Turks spent 700–1,000 shells per day. The walls were completely destroyed in parts. Only three towers among 11 were spared during the battle. Forces of Ottoman Empire stormed the fortress, but they sustained heavy losses and retreated. After the gun-fire forces of Ottoman Empire organized a massive attack against the fortress. Outnumbered Turkish Army forced the cossacks to retreat to the Citadel. Siege of Azov ends due to heavy toll (20–70 thousand wounded or killed in three months) problems with Turkish army support and supply of the provisions.

=== Russian period ===
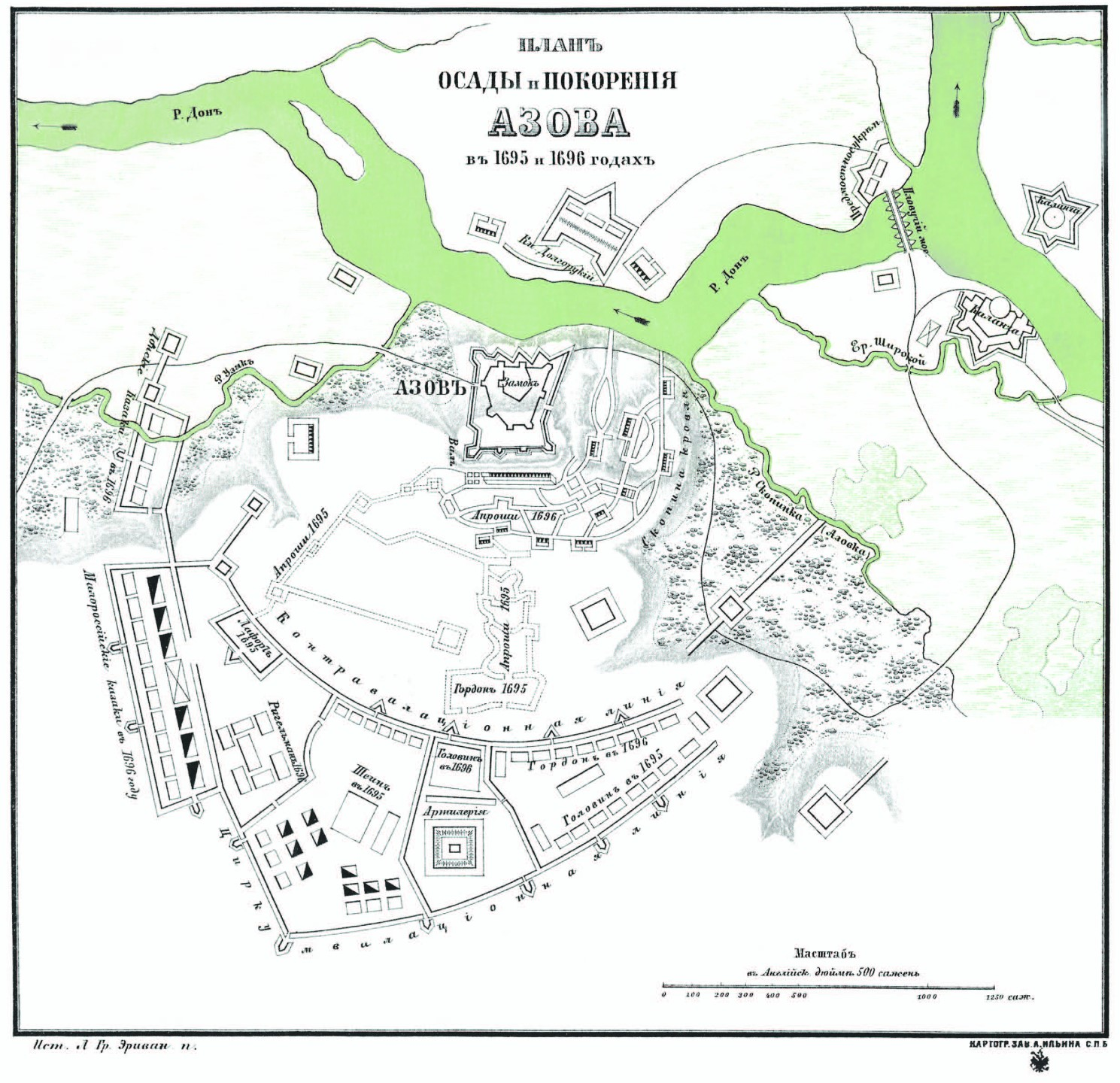
Azov campaigns of 1695–96

Peter the Great led the Azov campaigns of 1695–96. The military expedition advanced by land and water (the rivers of Voronezh, Volga and Don). The first attempt to storm the Azov Fortress under the command of general admiral Franz Lefort was undertaken on 5 August 1695. It was not successful. The Russian Army succeeded in occupying the watchtowers only. The number of dead and wounded Russian soldiers reached over 1,500 during the storming. The second storming of the Azov fortress was undertaken on 25 September. The Lifeguard Preobrazhensky Regiment and Semyonovsky Regiment under Fyodor Apraksin occupied most of the fortifications and were able to enter the town. However Turks had time to regroup and Apraksin's advance failed without support of other army units. The siege was lifted on 2 October.

The second Azov campaign was held in July 1696. The garrison of the fortress surrendered on 19 July during a long period of shelling. In 1700, by concluding the Treaty of Constantinople the Ottoman Empire reaffirmed recognition of Russia's possession of the Azov fortress. The Treaty of the Pruth of 1711 stipulated the return of Azov to the Ottoman Empire. The Tsardom of Russia was forced to sign the treaty because of severe situation of its army on the banks of the river Pruth at the end of the Russo-Ottoman War of 1710–11.

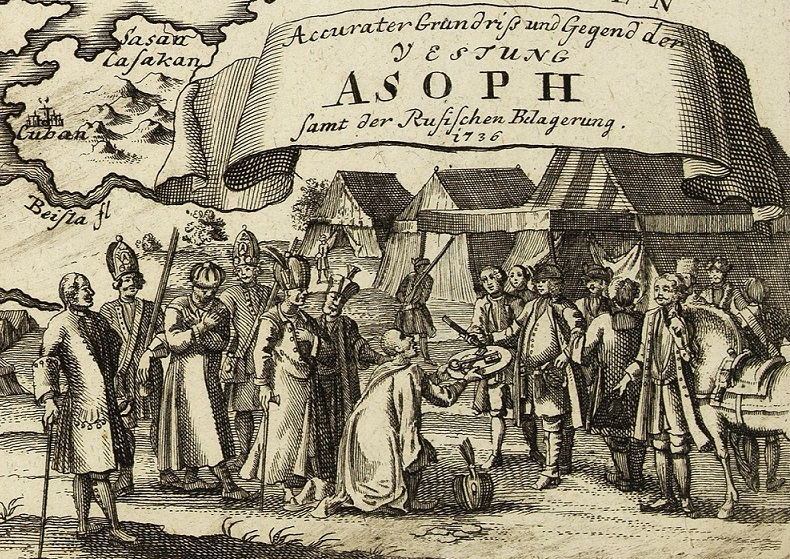
The surrender of Azov in 1736

The Don army (28,000 strong) under the command of imperial commander Peter Lacy besieged the fortress in 1736. Forces of Russia opened continuous artillery fire on the fortress on 11 June. Lacy gave an order to begin the storming in the night of 28/29 June. During the battle the Russian Army encountered unexpected resistance. The total Russian losses in the battle for the Azov fortress were 7 killed and 38 wounded. After the night attack Azov Pasha Mustafa Agha was invited to surrender the fortress to the Russians. Per the terms of the Treaty of Belgrade the city became part of the Russian Empire.

== See also ==
- Alekseevsky Gate
