= Lutic Fortress =

Fort in Mertvy Donets, Russia

Coordinates: 47.261°N 39.332°E

- Rostov Oblast, Russia

Site information
- Type: Fortress
- Controlled by: Russian Empire

Site history
- Battles/wars: Azov campaigns (1695–96); Siege of Azov (1736)

Lutic Fortress (Russian: Крепость Лютик) was a fortification structure located on the left bank of the northern channel of the Don delta, the River Mertvy Donets, in Rostov Oblast, close to Nedvigovka khutor. In the XVII-XVIII centuries the fortress was of strategic importance and defended the access to the Sea of Azov. After the Crimea Peninsula was incorporated into the Russian Empire, it fell into decay.

== History ==
=== Early period (1660-1695) ===
The fortress was laid down by the order of the Crimean Khan in the summer of 1660. Along with the Azov fortifications, Lutic was supposed to protect the Don delta from Russian attacks. The fortification structure was created by the hands of the Turks, Tatars, Hungarians, Wallachians, as well as Russian prisoners. It was square in shape, about 40 * 40 meters, and was surrounded by a moat. In the corners of the fortress there were high pentagonal towers. Inside there also were residential buildings (which could house up to 500 people garrison), stables and a stone mosque. Through the river stretched an iron chain, preventing the passage of Cossack boats.

At least two unsuccessful attempts were made to assault the fortress: by a Cossack detachment in 1661 and by the Russian troops in 1686.

=== Peter I campaigns (1696-1711) ===
During the Azov campaigns of Peter I Lutic was an important strategic point. The fortress was never taken by an assault, yet on 20 July 1696, the day after the surrender of Azov, its garrison laid down its arms after a siege. After conclusion of the Constantinople peace treaty, the fortifications in the vicinity of Azov, including Lutic, officially were handed to Russia.

Russian engineers reconstructed the defensive structures of Lutic, but all efforts were brought to nothing by the failure of the Pruth River Campaign. Fulfilling the terms of the peace treaty with Turkey, Peter ordered to blow up new fortifications.

=== 1713-1739 ===
Turkish troops were re-deployed in Lutik. But the fighting in this area was resumed only during the Russo-Turkish War (1735-1739). On 23 March 1736 part of the Russian Dnieper army under the command of Major-General von Spereiter with minimal losses took the fortress.

According to the peace treaty of 1739, Lutic was again given to Russia. There was established a post office.

=== Late period ===
After the end of the Ottoman rule in the Crimea, Lutic lost its strategic importance and was gradually abandoned. Local residents, the Don Cossacks, used the ruins of the fort for their needs. Archaeological study of the monument began only in 1970, when the expedition headed by V. F. Chesnok was sent to Lyutik.

Currently the fortress forms a part of the Tanais Archaeological Reserve Museum.

== Literature ==
- Бутков П. Г. — Материалы для новой истории Кавказа с 1722 по 1803 год.
