= Tanais =

Ancient Greek city in the Don River delta, Russia

- Τάναϊς (Ancient Greek); Танаис (Russian)
- Emporion
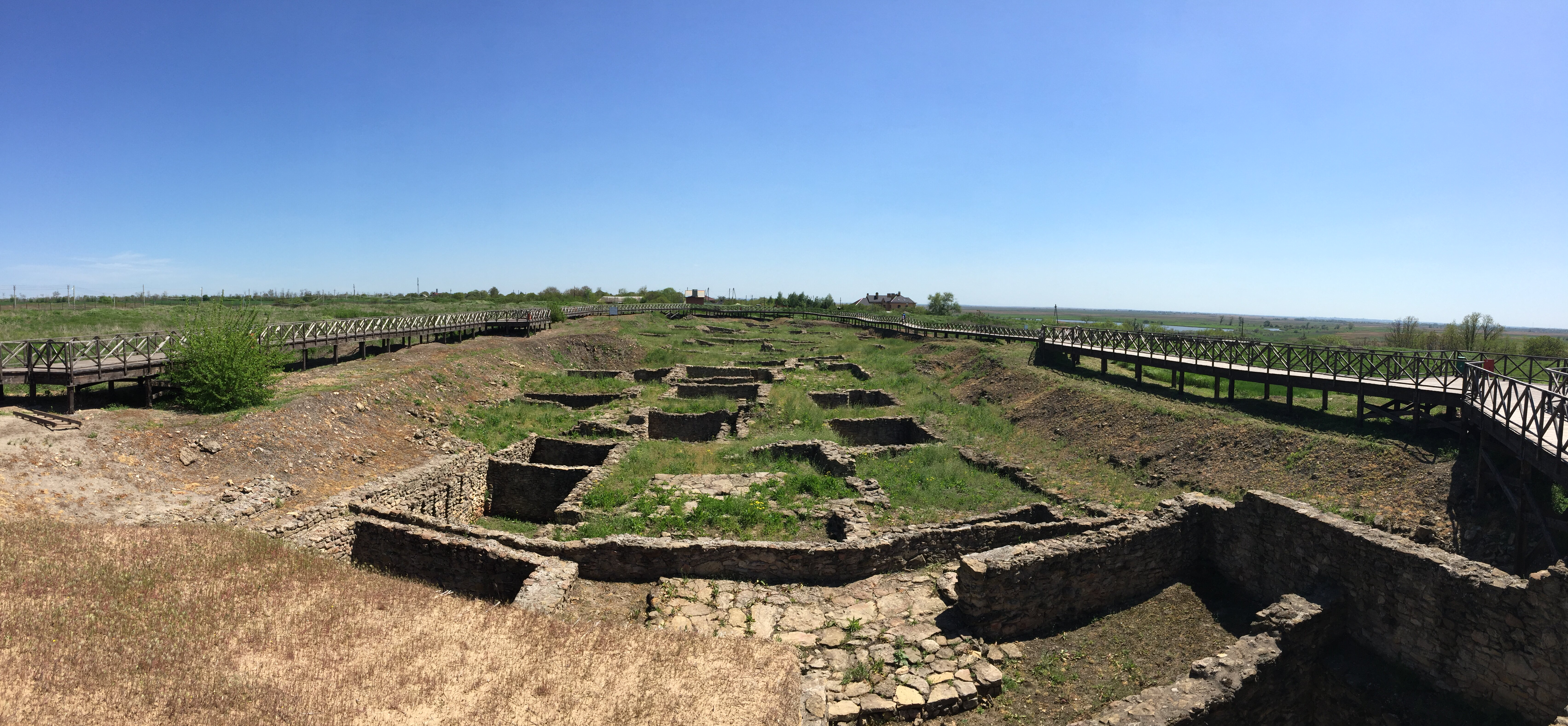
- The archaeological park of Tanais. May 2017

- Location within Rostov Oblast Location within European Russia
- 47°16′8″N 39°20′6″E
- Type: Settlement
- Periods: Hellenistic to Late Antiquity
- Cultures: Greek, Maeotian, Sarmatian
- Location: Nedvigovka, Rostov Oblast, Russia
- Region: Maeotian marshes
- Part of: Bosporan Kingdom

History
- Built: First quarter of the 3rd century BC
- Built by: Greeks of the Cimmerian Bosporus
- Abandoned: Second half of the 5th century AD
- Event: Sack by Polemon I (c. 8 BC)

Site notes
- Material: Limestone
- Area: c. 5 ha (walled quadrangle)
- Excavation dates: 1853; 1867; 1870; 1908–1909; 1955–present
- Archaeologists: Pavel Leontiev, Nikolai Veselovsky, Tatiana Knipovich, Dmitry Shelov
- Condition: Ruined
- Owner: Public
- Management: Tanais Archaeological Reserve Museum
- Public access: Yes
- Website: museum-tanais.ru/en/

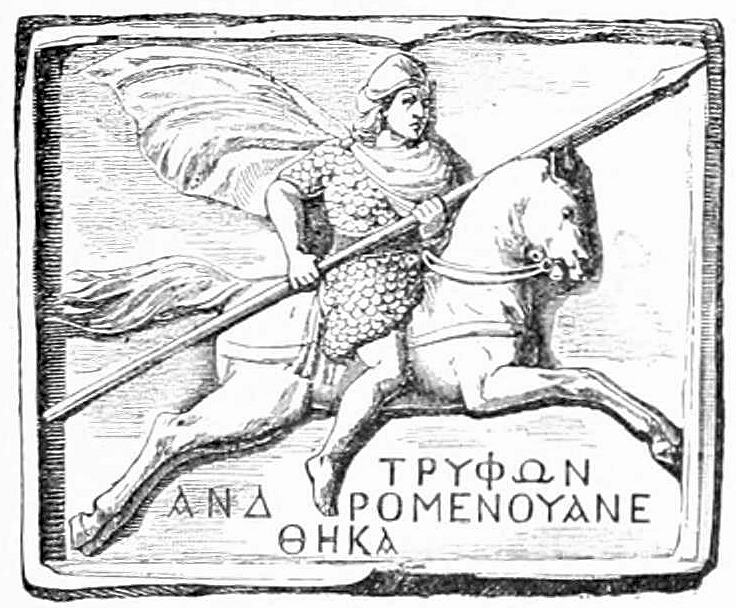
Relief from Tanais

Tanais (Greek: Τάναϊς, Tánaïs; Russian: Танаис) was an ancient Greek city in the Don river delta, at the northeastern edge of the Sea of Azov, called the Maeotian marshes in classical antiquity. Founded in the first quarter of the 3rd century BC by Greeks of the Cimmerian Bosporus, it was the northeasternmost permanent settlement of the Hellenistic world and the principal point of exchange between the Greek cities of the Black Sea and the Sarmatian, Maeotian and Scythian peoples of the steppe.

Strabo describes Tanais as "the common emporion of the Asiatic and the European nomads", where the nomads brought slaves, hides and pastoral produce and received in exchange clothing, wine "and the other things that belong to civilized life". He also records that a part of the Asiatic Maeotians was subject to "those who possessed the emporion on the Tanais", which makes the city a territorial power alongside the Bosporan kings. A further notice states that the city had "recently" been sacked by King Polemon for refusing him obedience. That sack is usually placed around 8 BC and is visible archaeologically as the burning and permanent abandonment of the city's western district.

The population was mixed from the outset. Inscriptions of the 2nd and 3rd centuries AD show a civic body divided into two named groups, the Hellenes and the Tanaitai, each headed by its own magistrates, and a very high proportion of Iranian personal names. Whether that duality goes back to the Hellenistic city, and whether Tanais was politically independent of the Bosporan kings before the 1st century BC, remain the central disputes in the study of the site.

Destroyed in the mid-3rd century AD and again in the later 4th, the city was abandoned in the second half of the 5th century. The name survived in the medieval Italian trading colony of Tana, established at the site of modern Azov, some 18.5 km to the south-southeast. Tanais was a bishopric as Tana and remains a Latin Catholic titular see.

== Name ==
Greek and Roman geographers called the city Tanais, after the river. Alexander Polyhistor, the earliest surviving author to mention it, states that "at the mouths of the Tanais into Lake Maeotis is founded the Hellenic city Tanais, which is also called Emporion".

That second name appears to have been the official one. No inscription from the site uses "Tanais" as the name of the civic community. Where the city is designated as a whole, it appears as τῇ πόλει καὶ τοῖς ἐμπόροις (tē polei kai tois emporois) or simply τῷ ἐμπορίῳ (tō emporiō), and CIRB 1237 describes a royal envoy as having been "sent by the king to Emporion". An honorary decree found in 1993 preserves the formula πρόεδροι βουλῆς [Ἐμπορ(ε)ιτῶν τῶν] κατὰ Βόσπορον (proedroi boulēs [Empor(e)itōn tōn] kata Bosporon), "the proedroi of the Council [of the Emporitai who are] in the Bosporos". The qualifier was necessary because Emporion was an appellative rather than a distinctive toponym. Askold Ivantchik compares Panticapaeum, commonly called Bosporus, and Olbia, commonly called Borysthenes: neither name was used officially in local documents.

The only occurrence of "Tanais" in an administrative context is the title ἄρχων Ταναέως (archōn Tanaeōs, CIRB 1237), which the context shows to be synonymous with ἄρχων Ταναειτῶν (archōn Tanaeitōn), the head not of the whole city but of one of its two constituent groups. Stephanus of Byzantium gives the ethnic as Ταναΐτης (Tanaïtēs); the inscriptions use Ταναεῖται (Tanaeitai).

A deity named Tanais was also worshiped in the city. A thiasos inscription of the 2nd or first half of the 1st century BC contains the name in the dative, Ταναει (Tanaei), declined as an i-stem. Ivantchik takes this to be the river god rather than a city god, since Tanais was not the city's official name.

== Location and topography ==
The Tanais (Don) River, the Greek colony of the same name and other Greek colonies along the north coast of the Black Sea.

The site lies at the modern khutor of Nedvigovka, about 30 km west of Rostov-on-Don, on the high right bank of the Mertvy Donets, the northernmost arm of the Don delta. Hydrologists regard this channel as the main bed of the Don during the city's lifetime. The central city site occupies a limestone terrace. The natural rock lies close beneath the surface, and cellars, cisterns, and grain pits were cut directly into it. The plateau is bordered by deep gullies to the east and west and by a ditch to the north, with a fall of up to 20 m to the south.

The site is now about 10 km from the sea, but Shelov argued that in antiquity the western part of the delta did not yet exist and the city stood directly at the river mouth on the shore of the Sea of Azov. He based this on Strabo's phrase ἐπὶ δὲ τῷ ποταμῷ καὶ τῇ λίμνῃ (epi de tō potamō kai tē limnē), "on the river and on the lake" rather than merely near their junction, and on the mismatch between Strabo's 60 stades (c. 11 km) for the distance between the two outermost mouths of the Don and the modern figure of some 18 km. He placed the ancient western limit of the delta roughly on the line Nedvigovka–Rogozhkino. East of that line lie the dunes carrying Bronze Age and Scythian-period camp sites; west of it no ancient material has ever been found.

Strabo places an island called Alopecia, "a settlement of promiscuous people", 100 stades from the emporion. Shelov identified this with the island on which the Elizavetovka settlement stood, 17 km from Nedvigovka in a straight line. He rebutted Viktor Gaidukevich's objection that πρόκειται (prokeitai) would require Alopecia to lie west of Tanais by surveying Strabo's use of the verb with islands throughout Books I–VI, where in every case it means only that the island lies opposite a point on the mainland coast.

== History ==
=== Earlier settlement in the Don delta ===
Greek contact with the lower Don long predates the city. Pliny the Elder preserves a notice, drawn from an earlier source, that "Carians held the neighboring parts first, then Clazomenians and Maeones, afterward Panticapaeans". Archaic Greek pottery has been recovered repeatedly from the seabed of Taganrog Bay: amphorae and banded Ionian wares, mostly of the later 6th and early 5th centuries BC, with occasional Rhodian Late Geometric kylikes. Underwater survey in 1960 confirmed the existence of a submerged settlement, and B. V. Lunin and V. D. Blavatsky took the earliest material to indicate a Greek trading factory or emporion established at the turn of the 7th and 6th centuries BC, flourishing through the 6th. It has been suggested that this archaic market town or fishing settlement was itself colonized from Miletus in Ionia around 625–600 BC, and even that it was the original Tanais, though both conclusions are disputed.

From the later 6th century, the principal center of exchange in the region was the Elizavetovka settlement, a large fortified site on an island in the delta. Shelov argued at length that this was not a Greek colony but a native settlement drawn into Bosporan trade. Handmade pottery outnumbers plain wheel-made ware more than five to one, the buildings are of wattle and daub, the ramparts are not fortifications of Greek type, and the kurgan cemetery is barbarian throughout, with akinakai, quivers, horse burials, and obligatory food offerings in the graves. Its ethnic attribution has been disputed at length, with proposals ranging from Royal Scythian to Maeotian to Sarmatian. Shelov concluded that the material shows a mixture of traditions rather than a single people, and that the disagreement among scholars is itself symptomatic.

Nineteenth- and early twentieth-century scholarship held that Elizavetovka was the earlier Tanais, transferred to Nedvigovka after Polemon's sack or after a shift in the hydrography of the delta. This "two Tanaises" theory originated with Pavel Leontiev's mistaken dating of the Nedvigovka material. Shelov demolished it on two grounds: the Nedvigovka site produced continuous occupation from the early 3rd century BC, and amphora stamps show that Elizavetovka survived into the first half of the 2nd century BC, overlapping Tanais by roughly a century.

=== Foundation ===
Strabo states that the city was κτίσμα τῶν τὸν Βόσπορον ἐχόντων Ἑλλήνων (ktisma tōn ton Bosporon echontōn Hellēnōn), a foundation of the Hellenes who held the Bosporus. Three classes of evidence point to a date in the first quarter of the 3rd century BC:

- Coins. Only five pre-Roman coins are known from the entire site, against several hundred of Roman date. Three are Panticapaean bronzes of the first quarter of the 3rd century BC, issues that dropped out of circulation quickly during the Bosporan monetary crisis.
- Amphora stamps. About thirty Rhodian stamps fall within the first half of the 3rd century, and at least a dozen belong to the turn of the 4th and 3rd centuries or the very beginning of the 3rd. They include the eponyms Eukles and Hagesias, a two-line Ἐπὶ Ἀριστ– (Epi Arist–), and the workshop stamps of Kreon, Dionysios, Zenon and Sthennidas. Thasian and Heracleote stamps, common at Elizavetovka, are entirely absent.
- Fine pottery. Black-glaze kantharoi and cups and a Gnathia-style sherd come from the earliest grain pits. There is no red-figure ware and nothing securely of the 4th century apart from a single small black-glaze wall fragment.

==== Who founded the city ====
Sergei Zhebelev read Strabo's phrase as meaning that the Bosporan government, "evidently in the person of the very first Spartocids", established a properly organized emporion at the Don mouth to serve the interests of Bosporan trade. On that reading, the city's subjection to the Spartocids follows automatically. Gaidukevich took the same view, differing only in placing the foundation in the 3rd century BC rather than under the earliest Spartocids.

Shelov accepted that the economic situation in the Bosporus at the start of the 3rd century BC would make such an initiative intelligible, but held that no source attests it. However, he conceded that Strabo elsewhere uses the very similar phrase οἱ τὸν Βόσπορον ἔχοντες (hoi ton Bosporon echontes) of the Bosporan rulers, in the passage on their dealings with the pirate tribes of the Caucasian coast, which would lend credence to a Spartocid foundation. Against this he set the word Ἑλλήνων (Hellēnōn). The Spartocid dynasty was ordinarily regarded by Greeks as barbarian, and the application of the term "Hellenes" to the rulers of the Bosporus is not otherwise attested. He concluded that Strabo's text gives no grounds for asserting direct Spartocid initiative. Participation by the Bosporan state is possible, but so is foundation by a group of private Bosporan citizens, merchants without official authority acting at their own risk. I. S. Kamenetsky's further suggestion that the founders were political fugitives or a faction in opposition to the Bosporan government, Shelov rejected as conjecture with no basis in the sources.

He drew a second conclusion from the same passage: that foundation by Bosporans does not in itself entail subsequent subjection, since "the independent and autonomous development of the newly created city was entirely within the traditions of Greek colonization".

Pliny's mention of Panticapaeans led Gaidukevich to suppose that they formed the nucleus of the colony. However, this must be taken with caution. Pliny may simply have called all Bosporans "Panticapaeans" after their capital, and his text in any case enumerates those who held influence in the district before the city was founded, not its founders. Shelov connected the notice instead with the demonstrable role of Bosporan, and perhaps particularly Panticapaean, traders during the Elizavetovka period, Panticapaean material being a significant proportion of the ceramic finds at that site. In the later history of Tanais, he noted, no specific link with Panticapaeum is detectable; the evidence points the other way, toward the Asiatic side of the Bosporus.

==== Economic background ====
Shelov set the foundation against a restructuring of the Bosporan economy at the start of the 3rd century BC. Against the Rostovtsev–Zhebelev model of decline caused by Egyptian grain undercutting Bosporan grain at Athens, he argued that the contraction of grain export had domestic causes: agrarian expansion had reached its limits by the later 4th century, craft production, urban population and local viticulture were raising internal consumption, and Sarmatian movement was eroding the purchase of grain from neighboring tribes. The substitute exports, slaves, livestock and pastoral produce and fish, are the goods Strabo names as traded at Tanais.

=== Hellenistic Tanais and the Bosporan Kingdom ===
Whether Tanais belonged to the Bosporan state before the 1st century BC is contested.

Strabo XI 2, 11 says that some of the Asiatic Maeotians were subject to "those who possessed the emporium on the Tanais" and others to "the Bosporans". The Spartocid royal titulature, which enumerates subject tribes, names neither the Tanaitai nor the Iaxamatae, whereas Aspurgus, who certainly did hold the lower Don, restores the old formula and does list Tanaitai and Tarpetai (CIRB 40). Bosporan coinage is effectively absent from the site, as are Panticapaean amphorae and roof-tiles, and in 1970 no lapidary inscription earlier than the 1st century AD was known from Tanais. On this evidence, Shelov concluded that the city was independent for most of its first three centuries and was annexed only in the course of the 1st century BC, perhaps only by Polemon. Additionally, Shelov held that the Spartocid realm never reached the Don delta, its northern limit lying among the Azov tribes near the Kirpili.

Shelov's arguments have been criticized by Ivantchik and Sergey Tokhtas'ev, who hold that the argument from titulature has no force once the city's official name is recognized as Emporion. If Tanais was reckoned as lying within "Bosporos" as a politico-geographical unit, it would not be itemized in the royal titles, "just like other cities which were covered by this name". Spartocid titulature distinguished communities the king ruled as archon, which retained full civic rights, from those ruled as basileus. Greek cities subsumed under "Bosporos" were not separately named.

Claims that Hellenistic Tanais had a democratic constitution rest chiefly on a single fragmentary inscription published by Yuri Vinogradov in 1995. Vinogradov restored the resolving formula as [τῷ] δήμῳ ([tō] dēmō, "by the people"), which would make the text a decree of a popular assembly, and took it to confirm both that the city had a civic community of its own and that it had remained independent of the Bosporus until the Mithridatic period.

However, it has been argued that the surviving trace fits omicron as readily as omega, and formulae naming a private association are at least as likely: τῷ κοινῷ (tō koinō, "by the association"), τοῖς θιασώταις (tois thiasōtais, "by the members of the thiasos") or τοῖς ἐρανισταῖς (tois eranistais, "by the members of the eranos"). The other two known Hellenistic inscriptions from the site are thiasos texts apparently cut in the same workshop, and this one is the least carefully executed of the three, which would be surprising in a public decree. Ivantchik concludes that "the suggestion that Tanais was independent in the Hellenistic period and that there was a democratic constitution in the city remains, as before, very much hypothetical, bereft of any direct confirmation from the sources". (Note: Tokhtas'ev had himself cited the same inscription in 2006 as evidence that "prior to the incorporation of Tanais into the Bosporan state it enjoyed a democratic constitution" (Tokhtas'ev 2006, p. 38 n. 99), before co-signing the 2011 paper which holds that "it is also doubtful that any democratic form of government had ever existed there at all" (Ivantchik & Tokhtas'ev 2011, p. 168).)

==== Authority over the Maeotians ====
Strabo credits Tanais with authority over part of the indigenous population of the eastern Azov littoral. Of the Asiatic Maeotians, "some were subjects of those who possessed the emporion on the Tanais, and the others of the Bosporians", while "in those days different peoples at different times were wont to revolt". The identity of the Maeotian tribes subject to Tanais is unknown. Shelov supposed them to be those occupying the stretch of coast nearest the Don, beyond the northern limit of Bosporan control, and identified them with the Maeotians whom Strabo elsewhere describes as farmers "no less warlike than the nomads", those nearer the Tanais being the wilder of them.

Strabo continues that the Bosporan rulers frequently held the territory as far as the Tanais, "and particularly the latest rulers, Pharnaces, Asander and Polemon". The disparity in military and economic weight was great; Tanais depended entirely on Bosporan goodwill for the route through the Kerch Strait that connected it with the Mediterranean world, and the unstable equilibrium in the region probably turned less on the strength of either power than on the disposition of the tribes themselves.

=== The sack by Polemon ===
Excavations found that at the turn of the first millennium, Tanais's whole western district was burned and permanently abandoned, its northern and western defensive walls were systematically dismantled for stone, and quantities of round stone catapult shot were recovered along the line of the fortifications, implying a regular army with artillery rather than nomads. Wall 5, dividing the two districts, was reduced to a stump about 2.70 m high. Houses of the 1st century AD were built against its outer face; a concentration of net weights suggests that one of them belonged to a fisherman.

Strabo records that "recently King Polemon sacked it for its disobedience". Polemon reigned on the Bosporus from 14 BC, installed by Agrippa, and died in 8 or 9 BC at the hands of the Aspurgiani.

Tanais may have supported Dynamis against Polemon. A monumental dedication of Dynamis's sole reign (c. 9 BC to AD 8/9), reconstructed at some 2.5–3 m in length and associated with a sanctuary of Apollo, was set up in the name of the people of Emporion and styles the queen "savior and benefactress". Monumental construction was therefore underway at Tanais almost immediately after the sack, dated c. 8 BC. Tanais' walls were nonetheless left in ruins for roughly a century afterward.

=== Roman period ===
Domestic and commercial building resumed at once, but the fortifications were rebuilt only at the turn of the 1st and 2nd centuries AD. The quadrangular circuit of walls, towers and ditches visible on the site today belongs to the 2nd century. The western district was never reoccupied as a residential quarter, and after the sack the whole population was concentrated within the quadrangle.

By at least the 1st century AD the city was governed by a Council headed by proedroi, which appears from the surviving decree to have been its supreme body. Below it stood the two communities of the Hellenes under a hellenarches and the Tanaitai under their archontes. A royal legate (presbeutes) sent from Panticapaeum supervised the city's institutions and their loyalty to the crown. The 2nd and 3rd centuries are the best-documented period, chiefly through dated building inscriptions: the restoration of a tower by "the Hellenes and the Tanaitai" in AD 192 (CIRB 1243), dedications of AD 188, 193, 220 and 236, and undated texts of the reign of Ininthimeus.

A monumental entrance to the agora was built in this period. Blocks from an earlier structure, including the Dynamis dedication and the decree honoring the son of Mathianes, were found reused in 4th-century houses raised over its ruins.

=== Destruction ===
Tanais was destroyed in the 240s AD. The destruction is commonly attributed to the Goths. The site was reoccupied and rebuilt in the 4th century, though without clearance of the burnt layers, over which new buildings were simply raised. A further destruction in the mid-4th century is marked by the deliberate filling of a cult cellar in which eighteen rams had been buried. Occupation continued into the second half of the 5th century, after which classical Tanais ceased to exist. The channel silted progressively, and the center of activity in the delta shifted eastward.

=== Venetian and Genoese Tana ===
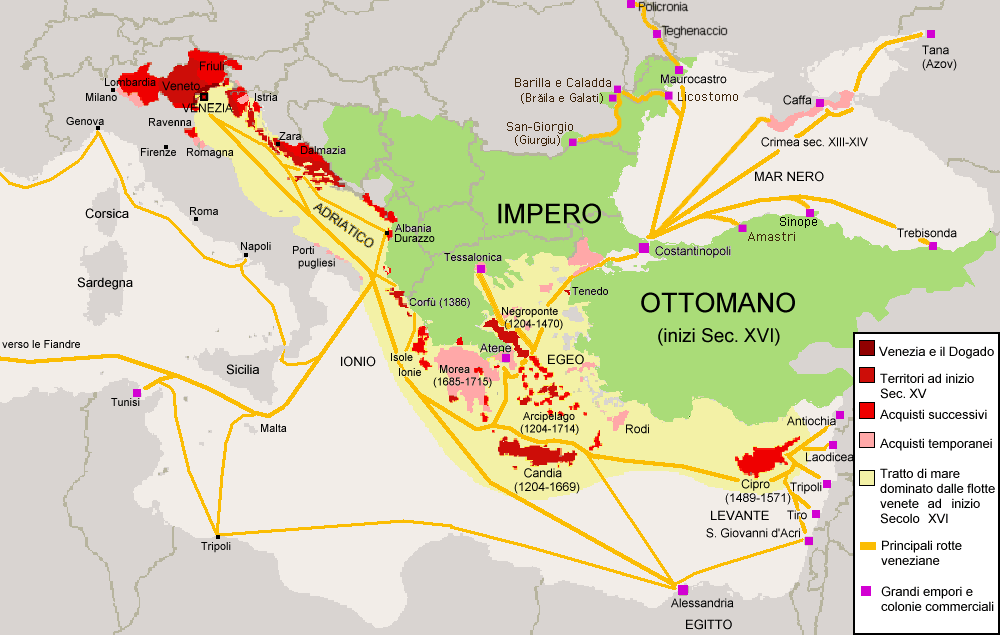
14th-century medieval Tana, a Venetian colony in the Don river delta

The name survived into the Middle Ages in Tana, an Italian trading colony established not on the ancient site but at what is now Azov, some 18.5 km farther south-southeast at the mouth of the main channel of the Don.

The Mongol conquest of Central Asia had opened the Black Sea as a hub for goods from China, Persia and Russia. The Venetians settled at Soldaia and Trebizond, but soon concentrated on Tana, better situated on both land and water trade routes. They would later settle in Maurocastro as well. Tana was the connecting point for the Danube, Polish, and Persian trade routes, as well as the route beginning in Astrakhan that led to China. Giosafat Barbaro mentioned how six or seven trade galleys came from Venice every year for the silks and spices from Astrakhan as well as other goods. He also described annual shipments of 40,000 cattle to Central Asia and caravans with 6,000 animals that went to India. Among the goods traded in Tana were caviar, salted fish, wine, amber, salt, grain, fur, horses and slaves, as well as spices and silk.

The Republic of Genoa administered its own quarter from 1332 to 1471 as Tana nel Mare Maggiore, an important place for trade with the Golden Horde and, like all their Black Sea colonies, controlled by the Genoese Consul at Kaffa.

In the fifteenth century, Tana was a modestly sized town mostly or entirely surrounded by walls with towers, and the commercial rivals Genoa and Venice fortified their sections of the town. Byzantine and Russian quarters were near the Orthodox Church of St Nicholas, and there were Jewish and Zichian quarters as well.

In 1438 the Great Horde under Küchük Muhammad advanced on Tana. Arsenio Duodo, the Venetian Consul to Tana, sent Giosafat Barbaro as an emissary to the Tatars to persuade them not to attack Tana. Later, Barbaro was part of a group of fewer than fifty that drove off a hundred Circassian raiders.

The Tatars attacked Tana in 1442, setting fire to the Venetian quarter, though many of the people survived due to the actions of Consul Marco Duodo, Arsenio's brother. The fire started in the bazaar near the fortress and was fanned by a strong north wind. Four breaches were made in the city walls, one by Giosafat Barbaro himself, for people to escape, but even then women and children needed to be lowered over the walls by rope. The fire burned for three hours until a combination of human efforts and rain extinguished it, and over four hundred people died. In 1442 there was also concern over the Turks raiding Venetian shipping. Between that and the siege and fire at Tana, the new Consul Pietro Pesaro was stranded in Caffa for several weeks at his own expense before he was able to relieve Marco Duodo. That July the Venetian Senate considered not sending trade galleys to Tana that year. Instead they ordered Lorenzo Moro to use the war galleys from Negroponte and Nauplia to escort the trade galleys commanded by Leonardo Duodo to and from Tana.

Marco Basso, the last Venetian Consul before the fall of Constantinople, left Tana before his term ended or his successor arrived. In December 1452, the galleys returning from Tana, three large merchant galleys commanded by Alvise Diedo and two smaller war galleys commanded by Gabriele Trevisano, arrived in Constantinople. Their instructions were to return to Venice within ten days of the arrival of another Venetian galley from Trebizond. That galley, commanded by Giacomo Coco, reached Constantinople on 4 December 1452, but Emperor Constantine XI and the Venetian Bailo Girolamo Minotto persuaded them to aid in the city's defense. The fall of Constantinople to the Turks in 1453 cut off the trade route to Tana. Venice and other Italian states tried to re-establish trade in the Black Sea or find alternate routes, but were not successful.

Tana was conquered by the Ottoman Turks in 1471, by the Russians in 1696, again by the Turks in 1711 and by the Russian Empire in 1771.

== Urban layout and defenses ==
The town was encircled by two walls, one of earth and one of stone. In the Hellenistic period, the city consisted of two adjoining districts of markedly different character, separated by a fortification wall.

The eastern district occupied the plateau later enclosed by the Roman-period quadrangle, an almost regular square of some 225–240 m a side covering upwards of 50,000 m². Little of its Hellenistic building survived later rebuilding, but what does survive is uniformly oriented, with right angles, neatly laid walls and straight lanes. Its western defense, wall 5, was built at the end of the 3rd or beginning of the 2nd century BC, is about 2.40 m thick and survives to 3.75 m. A rectangular tower bonded into it used regularly dressed and partly rusticated blocks at its corners and doorway, the only such masonry known from the site; it collapsed soon after construction, was crudely rebuilt in the 2nd century BC, and was never restored after the turn of the era.

Beyond wall 5 lay a second, larger quarter of more than 1,000 m², densely built with stone houses around small paved courtyards. It has no regular plan: orientations differ from house to house, rooms of irregular shape with curving walls are abundant, and the blocks are separated not by streets but by winding passages 1–2 m wide. The houses are of unworked stone laid in clay or mud, with beaten-clay floors, primitive hearths and grain pits dug directly in the floors, and roof-tile is so scarce that the roofs must have been of thatch or reed. Shelov read the contrast between the two districts as reflecting a difference in the population living in them.

The western district had its own wall on the north and west, about 3 m thick, of two faces with a rubble core, with no towers and no ditch. Its destruction is closely dated: undisturbed rubbish of the 1st century AD lies over its stumps and a house of that century was built on its line, showing that it had been deliberately dismantled for stone at the turn of the era.

Many dozens of pits have been excavated, a large proportion of them grain stores cut into the bedrock, the largest holding over 12 m³. A paved square of about 100 BC in the western district carried a stone-built water channel, a collecting cistern and a well.

== Economy ==
=== Trade ===
Strabo names Tanais the greatest emporion of the barbarians after Panticapaeum, and the city's own inscriptions sometimes call it simply "the emporion". Imports are overwhelmingly Rhodian: of 431 amphora stamps recovered between 1955 and 1960, 398 were Rhodian, against 17 Sinopean and small numbers of Cnidian, Coan and Chersonesan, with two local imitations of Rhodian stamps among the unidentified. Rhodian imports run from the first half of the 3rd century, peak around 220–180 BC and again in the second quarter of the 2nd, and collapse at the end of that century, after which light-clay amphorae with double-barreled handles predominate.

The goods exported cannot be traced archaeologically. Strabo names slaves and hides, and given the scale of local fishing, fish and fish products were presumably also exported. Strabo also states that the nomads barred the way upriver even where the Tanais was navigable, which would have made the city the furthest point Greek merchants could reach. Imports passing through Tanais can occasionally be identified in Sarmatian burials of the Don and Volga basins, and repeated finds of Olbian "Borysthenes" bronzes along the Volga suggest a 3rd-century BC route running from Olbia to the Don mouth and over the Volga–Don portage.

Over four hundred coins are recorded from the site, all but five of Roman date. Given how thoroughly the Hellenistic levels have been dug, the lack of coinage from these levels may indicate that monetary relations were undeveloped at Tanais before the 1st century AD and exchange was conducted in kind.

=== Production and subsistence ===
Charred grain from the Hellenistic levels comprises soft wheat, barley, and millet. Faunal analysis by V. I. Tsalkin showed sheep dominant in the early herd and cattle increasing later, very little pig by comparison with the Bosporan cities, abundant dog bones, and horses eaten as well as worked. Fishing was among the principal occupations throughout the city's life, with catfish and sturgeon dominant.

Local goldsmithing is attested by two casting molds cut from split Rhodian amphora handles and by a crucible, and traces of glass production have also been identified. Handmade pottery, the largest ceramic group after amphorae, was made household by household rather than by specialists, and spinning and weaving are attested by loom weights of the standard Greek vertical loom, a set of which was found in position in one room.

== Population and civic organization ==
=== Hellenes and Tanaitai ===
Inscriptions of the 2nd and 3rd centuries AD divide the citizen body into Ἕλληνες καὶ Ταναεῖται (Hellēnes kai Tanaeitai, "Hellenes and Tanaitai"; CIRB 1243, AD 192), each group headed by its own magistrates: a hellenarches on one side and an ἄρχων Ταναειτῶν (archōn Tanaeitōn, "archon of the Tanaitai") on the other, with a λόχαγος Ταναειτῶν (lochagos Tanaeitōn, "captain of the Tanaitai") also attested. One man styles himself Δημήτριος Ἀπολλωνίου Ταναεΐτης (Dēmētrios Apollōniou Tanaeïtēs, "Demetrios son of Apollonios, Tanaite"; CIRB 1249, AD 236).

Most scholars from Leontiev onwards have taken the division as ethnic. Karl Lehmann-Hartleben and Zhebelev read it instead as a civic distinction, the Hellenes being citizens and the Tanaitai resident or visiting merchants, and Gaidukevich proposed in 1963 that the archons of the Tanaitai governed the rural district rather than part of the urban population. Shelov objected to both readings: the Tanaite Demetrios restored a city tower at his own expense and held a priesthood in a Tanaite thiasos, and in the inscriptions the archons of the Tanaitai are named before the hellenarch.

When the division arose is disputed. Knipovich held that no real ethnic separation can have existed by the 2nd and 3rd centuries AD and that it must by then have been a survival from a period when the two communities lived apart; Shelov found a concrete basis for that in the two excavated districts and dated the arrangement to the 3rd century BC. D. I. Dan'shin and T. V. Zavoikina place its origin instead in the third quarter of the 2nd century AD, when it is first attested, and connect it with a new Sarmatian or Alanic influx. Ivantchik regards this as an argument from silence, since the offices are named almost exclusively in official building inscriptions while all the earlier known texts are private thiasos documents. A thiasos text of the 2nd or first half of the 1st century BC appears to contain the word ἑλληνάρχης (hellēnarchēs), which would be much the earliest attestation, though Ivantchik cautions that the restoration rests on three letters and the traces of a fourth.

Shelov argued that the Tanaitai were a tribe of the lower Don rather than a legal category, citing Pliny, Ptolemy and Ammianus, and above all their appearance beside the Tarpetai in the titulature of Aspurgus (CIRB 40). Their wider affiliation he left open, between Maeotian and Sarmatian. Two of the six names in the Hellenistic thiasos text are Iranian, Σφανος (Sphanos, from span- "dog") and Σαυρος (Sauros, from *sāv- "black"), which led Ivantchik to conclude that the roots of the non-Greek population were Iranian.

=== Onomastics and language ===
Of 938 names and patronymics from the Roman-period inscriptions, belonging to about 575 people, 55.2% are Greek, 4% Roman and 40.8% barbarian, some four-fifths of the last being Iranian. The balance shifts sharply over time: in the 2nd century 72% of Tanaitai bore Greek or Roman names against 19% Iranian, and in the 3rd century 52% against 39%. Mixed filiations are common, including hellenarchs with barbarian patronymics such as Ῥόδων Φαζινάμου (Rhodōn Phazinamou) and Ψυχαρίων Φιδάνου (Psychariōn Phidanou).

The inscriptions are in Greek, but with grammatical and orthographic errors dense even by the standards of late Bosporan texts, and with certain irregularities recurring too often to be accidental. Ustinova concludes that Greek served for official use while Sarmatian was spoken in daily life by much of the population. Sarmatian tamgas are incised on household objects and on slabs bearing Greek inscriptions throughout the city's history.

An epitaph on a relief of a horseman, now in the Temryuk Museum, reads βασίλισσα Δύναμις Μαθιανην Ζαιδαρου [μνή]μης χάριν (basilissa Dynamis Mathianēn Zaidarou [mnē]mēs charin, "Queen Dynamis, in memory of Mathianes son of Zaidar-"). It is the only known instance of a reigning Bosporan ruler erecting a funerary monument, implying an exceptional degree of status. Both names are Iranian, and Tokhtas'ev argued on phonological grounds that they must be Sarmatian rather than Persian. A son of the same Mathianes was honored in the mid-1st century AD by the Council of Emporion, in the only honorary decree known from any Bosporan city of the Roman period.

=== Burial customs ===
Rather fewer than fifty burials of the 3rd to 1st centuries BC have been excavated, all of them east of the site, nearly all in simple earth pits and all at least 2 m deep. The cemetery lay outside the walls and comprised inhumations with a few cremations.

Greek and non-Greek elements are mixed throughout. Cremation, taken to have been introduced by Greeks, appears almost exclusively in the earliest period; the eastern or northeastern orientation of the body is maintained without exception; and funerary food offerings, standard in Maeotian and Sauromatian graves, are absent.

Shelov regarded a cremation of the later 3rd century BC as the one grave that can confidently be called Greek, chiefly on the strength of two spindle-shaped clay toilet flasks of a type never found in any other burial at the site. Otherwise, no ethnically "pure" burial can be isolated, which he took to show that the whole barbarian population shared a fused culture rather than that distinct groups buried separately. Craniological study by M. M. Gerasimova identified two and possibly three types in the cemetery; she concluded that at Tanais cultural influence preceded biological admixture.

== Religion ==
A sanctuary of Apollo is attested by the monumental dedication of Dynamis's reign, which preserves the god's name in the genitive, and by a votive offering of the reign of Eupator (CIRB 1239). Ivantchik suggests that, Tanais having been founded by Bosporan Greeks of largely Ionian origin, the cult inherited from its metropolis Panticapaeum was among the city's principal ones. The sanctuary has not been identified on the ground.

A cult of the river god Tanais is attested by a thiasos dedication of the 2nd or first half of the 1st century BC and, two centuries later, by a thiasos "celebrating the day of Tanais" (CIRB 1259, AD 104). Earlier scholars read the latter as the anniversary of the city's rebirth after Polemon's sack. Ivantchik rejects this, since a civic festival of the kind would not have been celebrated by a private association and the Hellenistic text shows the cult already existing before the sack.

Tanais has produced most of the Bosporan documents concerning Theos Hypsistos, whose associations appear to have included virtually the whole male citizen body. Ustinova argues that the god was of local Iranian origin, reasoning that thiasotes who lived and buried their dead in the local manner are unlikely to have worshiped anything but an ancestral deity, perhaps lightly Hellenized. With Aphrodite Ourania it is one of only two cults she regards as firmly established at the site. Greek gods otherwise appear rarely in the inscriptions, and two of the three such dedications were commissioned by royal legates.

No temple or shrine of a Greek god has been uncovered on the site. Two cellars can be identified as cultic: one containing clay stamp seals, and one filled before the mid-4th-century destruction, in which eighteen rams had been buried together with a terracotta eagle. Comparable ram burials are known from indigenous sites, notably Scythian Neapolis.

All three known Hellenistic inscriptions from the city are thiasos documents, one of them naming a νεωκόρος (neōkoros, "temple warden"), an office otherwise recorded only once in the thiasoi of the North Pontic region. Ivantchik suggests that private associations, in which members were equal regardless of origin or status, may have been an important means of bringing Greeks and barbarians together at Tanais.

== Archaeology ==
In 1823–24 I. A. Stempkovsky twice visited the lower Don and identified the Nedvigovka site with ancient Tanais. The identification was confirmed in 1853, when Pavel Leontiev carried out the first excavations there and found inscriptions naming Tanais and the Tanaitai. These were among the first large-scale excavations in Russia undertaken for historical rather than acquisitive purposes, but they were destructive. Leontiev's trenches removed large sections of the cultural layer with almost no recording, and they opened the site to systematic stone-robbing that continued for decades, the material being carried off by barge to building works at Rostov and Azov. Leontiev's misdating of the material, in which he recognized nothing earlier than the Roman period, generated the long-lived "two Tanaises" theory.

Further work followed under V. G. Tiesenhausen (1867), P. I. Khitsunov (1870), and Nikolai Veselovsky, who opened 87 graves in the earth-grave cemetery in 1908–09. Potters' kilns have also been uncovered. Tatiana Knipovich's 1949 monograph summed up everything then known and fixed the site's occupation as running from the 3rd century BC to the 4th century AD, but was necessarily source-critical in character. The earlier excavators had left no plans, no stratigraphic record and no grave-group inventories, and only an arbitrary selection of finds survived in museums.

Systematic excavation began in 1955 with the creation of the Lower Don Archaeological Expedition, which by 1970 had opened several thousand square meters of the site and more than 250 graves across fourteen seasons. One methodological result of that work was Shelov's recovery of Leontiev's lost 1853 site grid. By solving for its module, 20 sazhens, against the known positions of the corner towers, he was able to relocate 19th-century finds on a modern plan, and showed in the process that the "south gate" of the literature is in fact a previously unsuspected second gate in the north wall.

A joint Russian–German team has more recently worked at the site, with the aim of exposing the agora and assessing the extent of Hellenistic influence on the urbanism of the city and its defensive responses to the surrounding nomadic cultures. Excavation in trench XIX in 1993 recovered, reused in 4th-century AD housing built over the ruined monumental entrance to the agora, the fragments of the Dynamis dedication and of the decree honoring the son of Mathianes. A study of unpublished material in the Tanais Museum store identified three further inscriptions of the 2nd or first half of the 1st century BC, one of them found as early as 1969 and unnoticed for nearly forty years. These are the earliest inscriptions so far known from the site, and their existence refutes Shelov's prediction that the absence of pre-Roman lapidary epigraphy at Tanais was permanent and reflected a real absence of the practice.

The Tanais Tablets, marble slabs bearing lists of the members of religious associations, are among the best-known finds from the site.

In the book Jakten på Odin, author Thor Heyerdahl advanced a highly controversial idea postulating connections between Tanais and ancient Scandinavia. In preparation for the book, he conducted some archaeological research on the site of Tanais. Heyerdahl's idea was based on the Old Norse sagas of Snorri Sturluson (1178–1241).

=== Genetics ===
9 Y-chromosome markers were obtained from a skeleton. The result was 389I=13, 389II=30, 458=15, 385=11, 393=13, 391=11, 635=23, 437=14, 448=19. This result is characteristic of haplogroup R1a.

== Modern presentation ==
The site is managed as the Tanais Archaeological Reserve Museum. An exhibition mounted in 2016 presented Tanais as a polis in its early period which retained "certain features of polis democracy" after joining the Bosporan Kingdom at the very end of the 1st century BC, describing these as privileges left to the Tanaitai by the supreme authority. Ivantchik and Tokhtas'ev hold that polis institutions can hardly have existed at Tanais in the 1st century AD in the form they took in the older Greek cities, and that "it is also doubtful that any democratic form of government had ever existed there at all".

== See also ==
- List of ancient Greek cities
- List of Catholic dioceses in Russia
- Tanais Tablets
- Tanais Archaeological Reserve Museum
- Elizavetovskaya
- Bosporan Kingdom
