= Alekseevsky Gate =

Military monument

Coordinates: 47°06′56″N 39°25′16″E

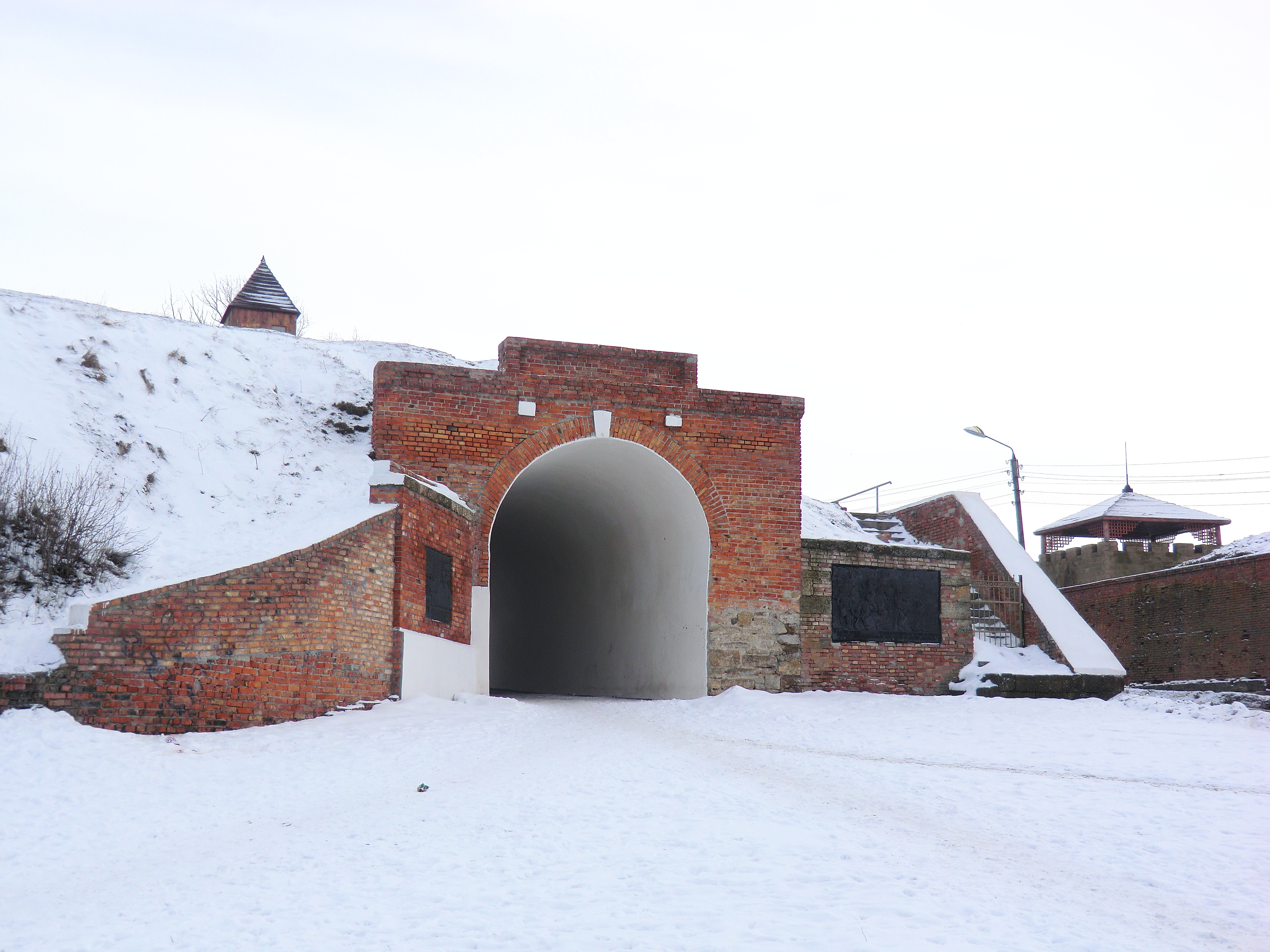
The Alekseevsky Gate

The Alekseevsky Gate (Russian: Алексеевские ворота) is the former main gate of the Azov Fortress of the 15th century. The Gate dates to a later period - 17th- 18th centuries. The Alekseevsky Gate served as the southern entrance to the fortress. Together with the earthen rampart and the moat, it forms the only preserved part of the fortress, they are entered in the list of objects of cultural heritage of federal importance.

== History ==
The Azov fortress was constructed by Turks, then given to Russia in 1696 as a result of the successful Azov campaigns led by Peter the Great. Officially, the possession of Azov by Russia was secured by the Constantinople Peace Treaty concluded between Russia and Turkey. In the eighteenth century, Russian military engineers led by the Austrian A. I Laval carried out the restructuring of the ramparts and built eleven gates, including Alekseevsky. Initially, the Alekseevsky Gate was wooden, but in 1801-1805 it was rebuilt into a stone gate.

In 1935, archaeological excavations were carried out on the territory of the Azov fortress by the Rostov Regional Bureau of Monument Protection. By this time the Azov fortress was completely destroyed, there were two parallel stone walls from the Alekseevsky gate. In the course of restoration, historians and architects tried to get the Alekseevsky gate back to its original form. They represent gate with the vaulted tunnel put from a stone and a brick. Several commemorative plaques were established on the walls of the gate.
