= Siege of Azov (1736) =

1736 siege during the Russo-Turkish War (1736–1739)

- Part of the Russo-Turkish War of 1735–1739
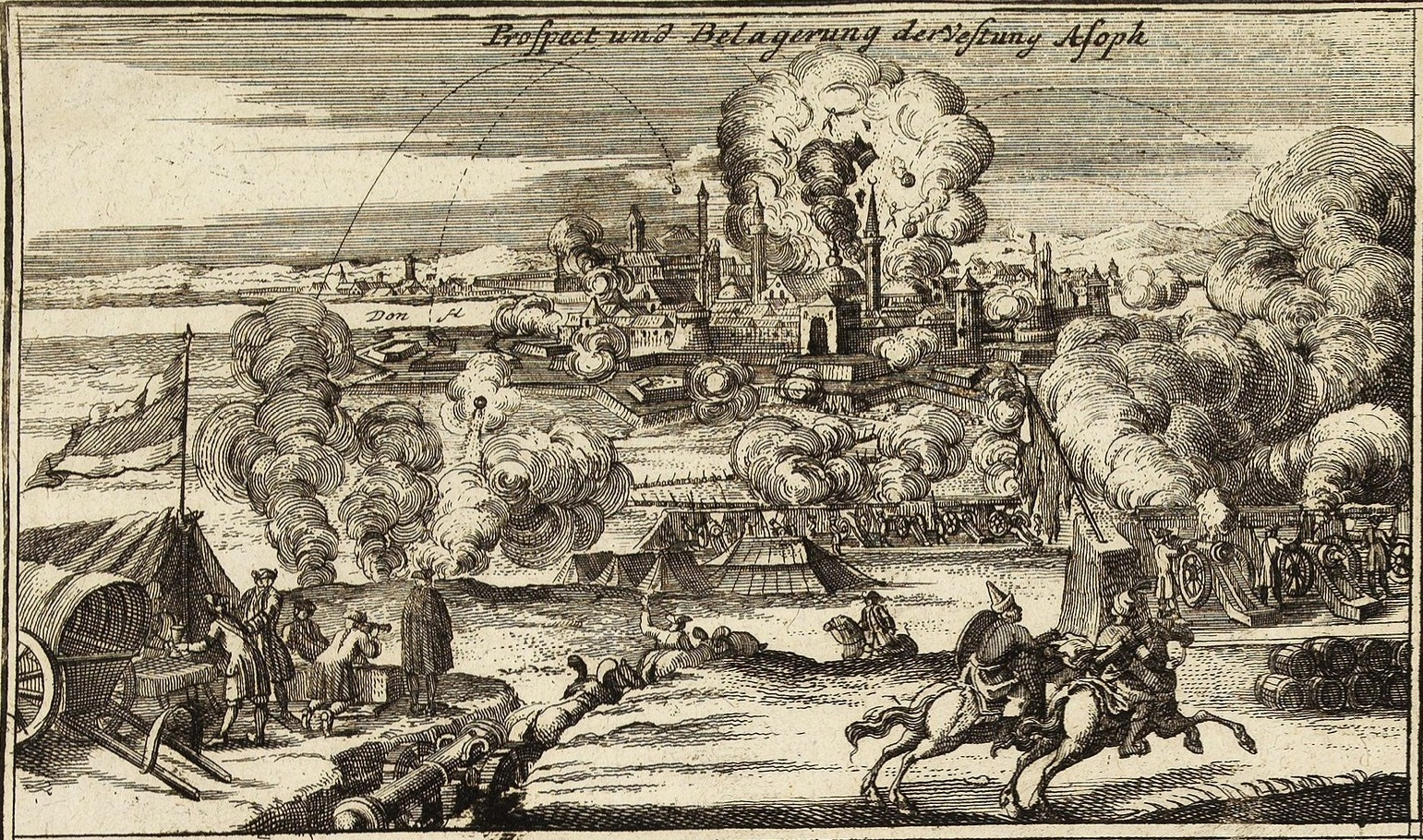
- Azov Castle
| Date | 30 March – 8 July 1736 |
| Location | Azov Fortress and its vicinity |
| Result | Russian victory |

Belligerents
| Ottoman Empire | Russian Empire; Zaporizhian Cossacks |

Commanders and leaders
| On land: Mustafa Agha (surrendered); Ada-Baş (surrendered); At sea: Jiakul-Kodia | On land: Khristofor Münnich (until 6 Apr); Vasily Levashov (until 15 May); Peter Lacy (WIA) (until 8 Jul); At sea: Peter Bredal |

Strength
| 5,890 soldiers 224 cannon on land | 9,250 soldiers initially 28,000 soldiers in all: Up to 800–1,000 cannon in all; • 135 cannon on land |

Casualties and losses
| 1,500–2,427 killed | 1,250 killed or 200 killed and 1,500 wounded |

The siege of Azov (1736) was fought during the Austro-Russian–Turkish War (1735–39) and ended with the Russian capture of Turkish Azov Fortress. On the Russian side, the land siege was commanded sequentially: Münnich (30 Mar – 6 Apr), Levashov (6 Apr – 15 May), Lacy (15 May – 8 Jul); the force of the Navy was led by Bredal. On the Turkish side, the garrison was led by Mustafa Agha and the fleet by Jiakul-Kodia.

== Prelude ==
The vanguard of the Russian army came to the front of Azov Fortress on April 10, 1736, and committed plunder, and then on April 11, the Russian army of approximately 90,000 people under the command of Peter Lacy attacked. One third of the army surrounded the castle.

On the other hand, Ottoman Empire sent forces from the Safavid Iran front to Kefe castle and appointed Trebizond Eyalet Yahya Pasha for the defense of Özi castle, Azov could not reinforce the castle. Since the Crimea peninsula was also the target of the Russian army, Crimean Khan Qaplan I Giray also could not come to help. Likewise, he gave the order for the Ottoman Empire to reach the front immediately. Rumelia Eyalet and Bosnia Eyalet and Sanjak of Vidin did not have the opportunity to reach the region in time by covering the long distance (The Ottomans did not have the opportunity to reach the region in time after a year. He did not have the intelligence that the Holy Roman Empire would also enter the war as an ally of the Russians).

== Progress ==
Münnich approached the vicinity of Azov, 6.4 kilometres (4.0 mi) from the castle and set up camp on 30 March. On the night of 31 March Spereiter's special detached force attacked and occupied left-bank fire lookout tower, then it moved to the right-bank tower. The tower's occupying force under Ada-Baş agreed to surrender it in exchange for leaving for the Azov Fortress. The Azov garrison set fire to a fortress vorstadt. Münnich sent Spereiter's detachment against the Lutic Fortress. The garrison, not expecting an attack, tried to leave the fortress and go to Azov, but was captured. The Russians captured 20 cannon and supplies from the fortress. Having captured Lutic, the Russians were able to reach the sea, bypassing Azov. For this purpose, 1,000 Cossacks were allocated, who went out to the Sea of Azov in boats. There Cossacks were to build redoubts and place 14 cannons.

On 5 April, General Levashov arrived. On 6 April, Münnich left to prepare for a new Crimean campaign and gave the army to him. Lacking sufficient forces, Levashov concentrated on the blockade (narrowing it if possible), building additional fortifications for his camp and delivering supplies and materials necessary for the siege. The first two Turkish sorties were repelled (the first thanks to the Cossacks who arrived later), Levashov learned about the third in advance and assigned Cossacks to an ambush, so the third he also repelled.

Field Marshal Lacy arrived on 15 May and replaced Levashov. Starting from May 24, siege artillery opened fire on Azov and continued to do so throughout the engagement. Lacy began an active siege. The Turks did not sit idly by and were making sorties, interfering with the siege works; all of them were repulsed, but some were such that the Russians lost 212 in one. Lacy stated that the Turkish artillery was not ineffective. Even the Tatars make diversions. Coming from the steppes, they broke into the fortress. The Russians had everything in order with provisions. Lacy ordered Bredal to take measures to prevent boat communication with Azov, and ordered some of the ships to be sent to the mouth. On 2 June, Bredal sent 6 small prams under the command of Lieutenant Kostomarov to the mouth. Jiakul-Kodia approached with a fleet and was going to deliver reinforcements, but the shallow waters of Don River did not allow it, and the boats were threatened by the power of the Russian flotilla. On 11 June, Lacy opened fire on the fortress werke with all his cannons. This fire, which, a few days later, was being helped by Bredal's prams, was maintained throughout the siege. On 19 June, a magazine exploded in Azov after being hit by a bomb. The explosion destroyed 5 mosques, 100 houses and killed about 300 people. The Russian army first captured Paşakalesi, close to the Azak (Azov) Castle, and the Janissary Castle opposite it. Then, the Ottoman garrison of the remaining 3,000 people, who resisted the fire of 800–1,000 cannons a day with the contribution of the thin fleet that came from the Russians via Don, surrendered after the castle walls and inner quarters were completely destroyed. The Ottoman garrison evacuated the castle and crossed into Ottoman territory.

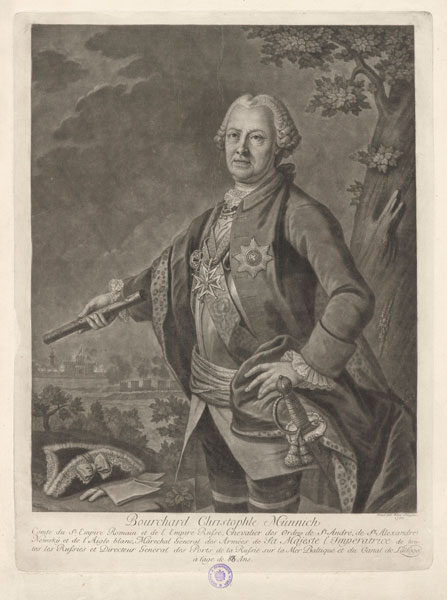
Münnich (1765 engraving, Pushkin Museum)

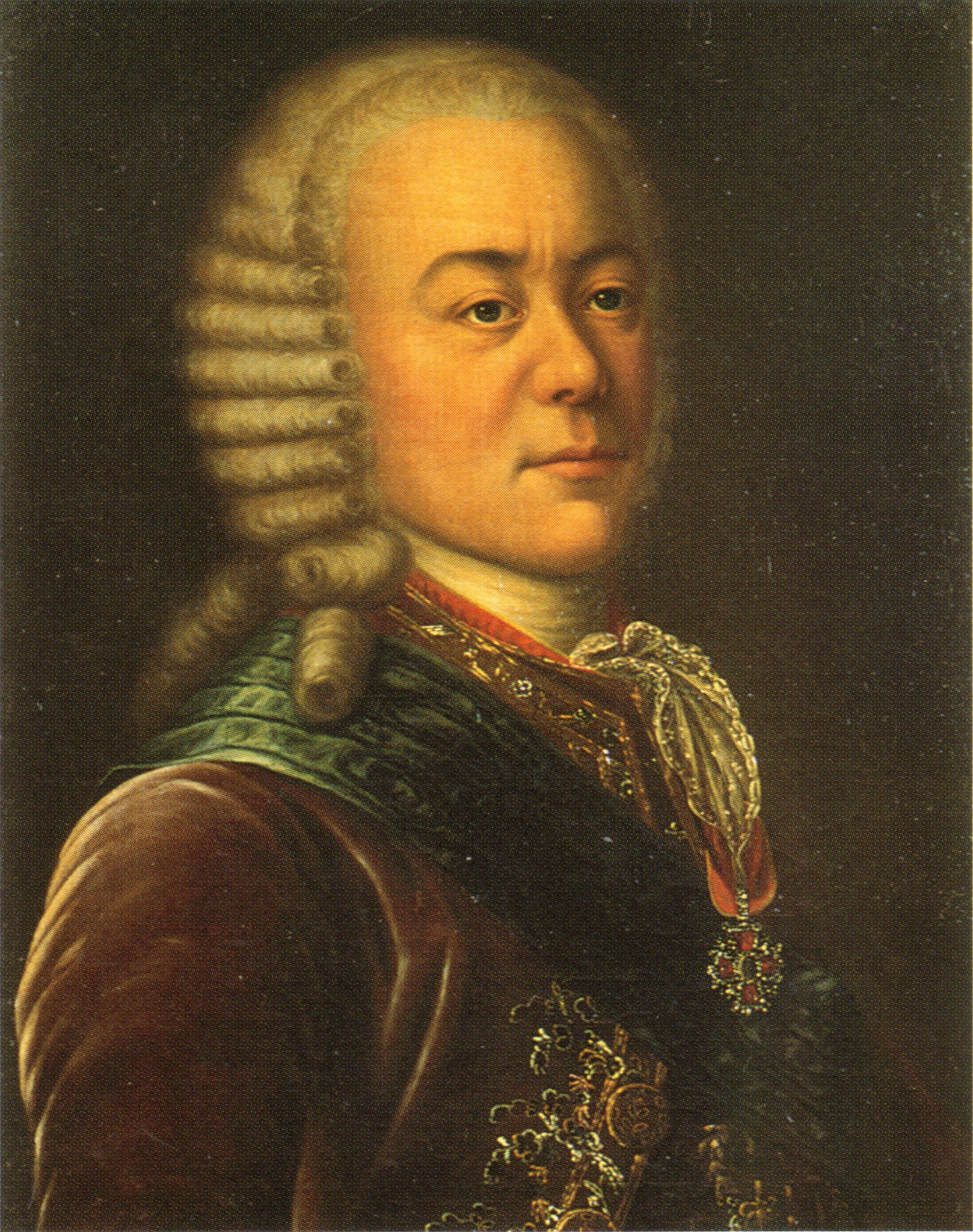
Levashov (XVIII century painting)

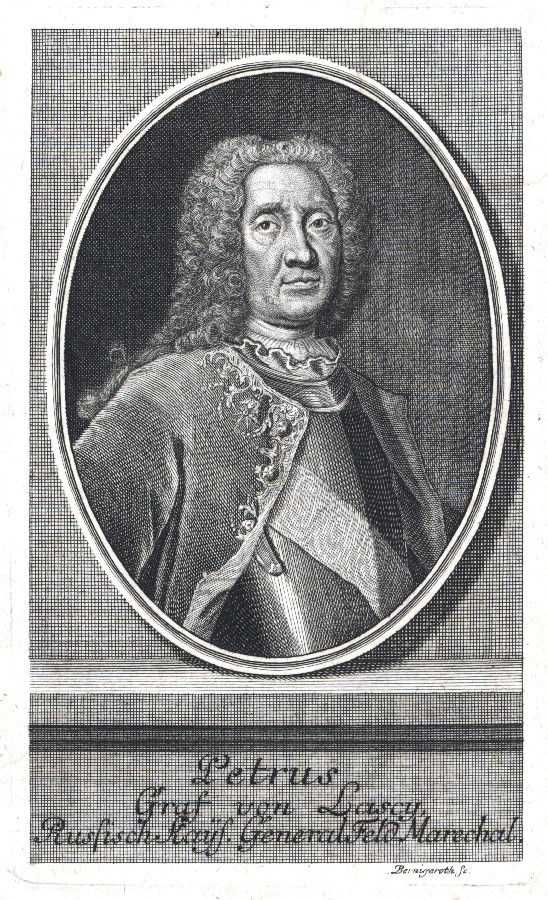
Lacy (1730 portrait)

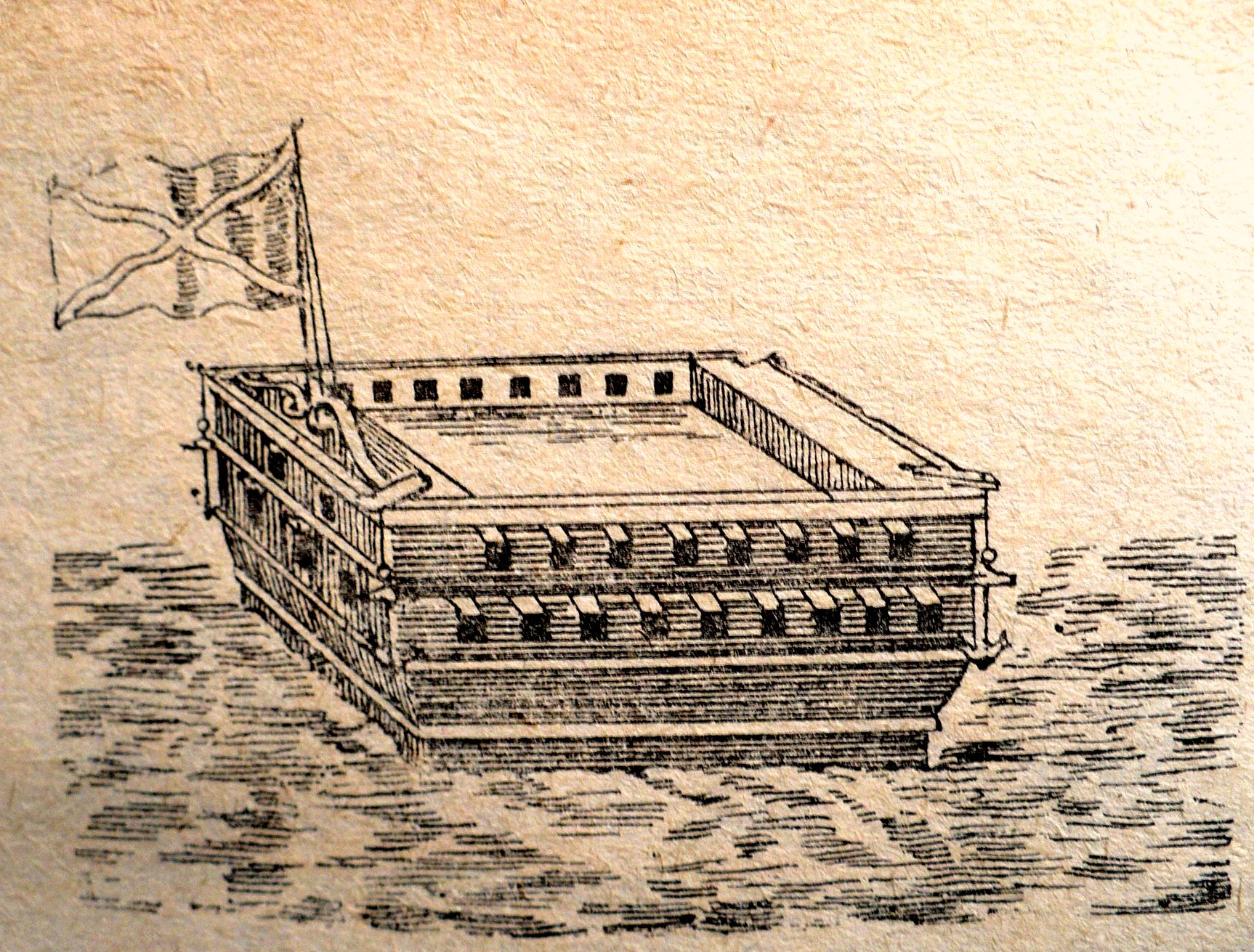
Prams were used by admiral Bredal

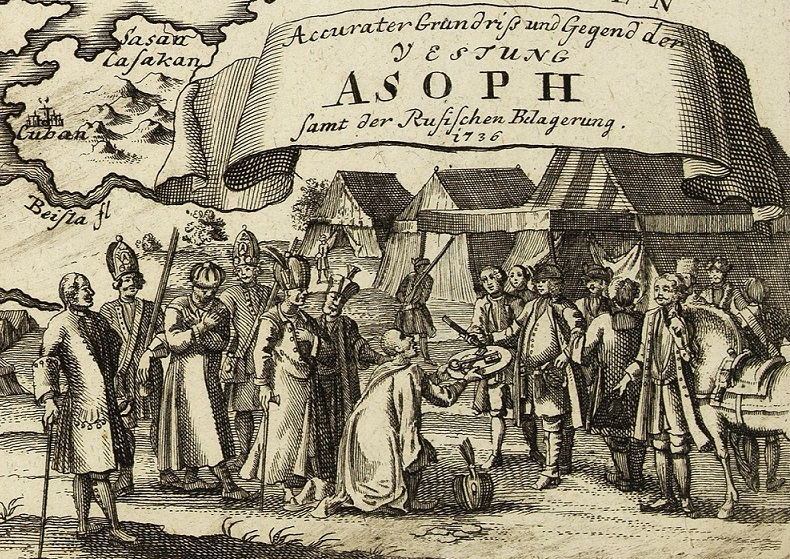
Capitulation of Azov (1740 engraving)

== Sources ==
- Ćirković, Sima (2004). The Serbs. Malden: Blackwell Publishing. ISBN 9781405142915.
- Ingrao, Charles, ed. (2011). Passarowitz, 1718. West Lafayette: Purdue University Press. ISBN 9781557535948.
- Sergei R. Grinevetsky, The Black Sea Encyclopedia, 2015 ISBN 9783642552267
- Bayov Aleksey Konstantinovich, The Russian army during the reign of Empress Anna Ivnnovna. The war between Russia and Turkey in 1736-1739 Volume I, 1906. ISBN 551942120X
