= Jakten på Odin =

Archaeological project by Thor Heyerdahl

The Search for Odin (Norwegian: Jakten på Odin) is the project title of Thor Heyerdahl's last series of archaeological excavations, which took place in Tanais in Russia.

== Theoretical background ==
Heyerdahl's intention was to prove the veracity of the account of Snorri Sturluson in the Ynglinga saga, written in the 13th century, about the origin of the Norse royal dynasties, and the pre-Christian Norse gods. Snorri provides a euhemeristic account, in which he describes the Norse god Odin and some other Norse gods, the Æsir, as having been real people who emigrated from the area around the river Don to Scandinavia at the time of the Roman expansion into their old homeland. In Scandinavia, Snorri writes, they so impressed the native population that they started worshipping them as gods.

Heyerdahl tried to seek the origins of the Æsir, following the route set out by Snorri Sturluson in the Ynglinga saga, from the Black Sea and the river Tanais (referred to by Snorri Sturluson by the names Tanaís and Tanakvísl) via Saxon homelands in northern Germany, Odense on Fyn, Denmark to Old Sigtuna, ancient Sweden. When Heyerdahl died in 2002 the second season of excavations had just been finished.

== Critique ==
Heyerdahl's Odin project was subjected to fierce criticism from Norwegian academics within the fields of research upon which the theory touches. Both the first book detailing the Odin project, Ingen grenser from 1999, and the second book, Jakten på Odin from 2001, were met with a forceful and detailed response from leading academics in which the reasons were laid out to the wider public as to why Heyerdahl's theory in their view was false. After the last book the attacks against Heyerdahl were also worded in a way that was seen by many as disrespectful. The five leading academics responsible for the reviews explained that although popular literature would not normally be subject to such scrutiny, they felt it was necessary in this case, partly because Heyerdahl himself laid claim to academic credentials and partly due to his popularity.

The reviewers, speaking on behalf of the academic community of Norway, categorize Heyerdahl's theory as an example of pseudoarchaeology, based on a selective reading of sources, and a lack of understanding, or a lack of willingness to use basic scientific methodology. Much of the foundation of his theory, they point out, is based on similarities between names of figures from Norse mythology and geographical place-names of the present time in the Pontic steppe and Caucasus. Comparison of these names is done with disregard of linguistic theory, according to the reviewers.

Azov is believed by Heyerdahl to have derived its name from as-hof – temple of the Æsir. Mainstream linguists and historians will say that the city of Azov got its name from the Turks, over 1000 years after Heyerdahl believes the Æsir lived there. Heyerdahl also points to the similarities between the word Æsir and the Azeri and Ossetian peoples of the Caucasus, between the god Odin and the Caucasian language group Udi and between the god Tyr and Turkey, and between the Vanir (a group of Norse gods) and the word Vannic, which was for a time in the 19th and 20th centuries the name used for the Urartian language, spoken in ancient times in the area around Lake Van.

== See also ==
- House of Ynglings
- Mythological kings of Sweden
