= River god =

River god may refer to:

- River gods (Greek mythology)
- River deities, among the various water deities from different cultures
- River God, a 1993 novel
