= Kamennaya Balka =

Kamennaya Balka is a natural monument under the protection of the Rostov regional government. Kamennaya Balka comprises multiple campsites of ancient humans dated back to the Stone Age (late Paleolithic period). This is an open-air site near the village of Nedvigovka in Rostov oblast located on the promontory of the right bank of a deep old ravine which enters the Mertvij Donets river valley. The unity of several campsites found in Kamennaya Balka is attributed to Kamennobalkovsky culture.

== Discovery of campsites ==
There are three campsites – platforms for season settlements in Kamennaya Balka: Kamennaya Balka 1 (14,500 BCE, existed during a period characteristic of cold, wet weather and plenty of forests); Kamennaya Balka 2 (16,000 – 15,500 BCE, its foundation was due to a temporary climate improvement in the northern Azov Sea area). Monuments of Kamennaya Balka were discovered by M.D. Gvozdover in 1957. A systematic excavation began under the direction of Gvozdover and the Research Institute of Moscow Lomonosov State University in 1958 until 1971. The excavations were conducted intermittently from 1957 to 2005. There is one more campsite in Kamennaya Balka: Third Cape, also known as Kamennaya Balka 3. It was discovered by Marianna Gvozdover in 1962. From 1990 the investigation of Third Cape was continued by an archeological expedition under the direction of State Historical Museum and N.A. Khaykunova.

== Cultural layers of Kamennaya Balka ==
The main lithological layers (packs) of Kamennaya Balka differ mainly in color: brownish-pale-yellow, pale-yellow, brown, reddish-brown, green. The campsite has three cultural layers:

- in the upper part of the brown pack is the lower cultural layer of the campsite, the thickness of which is about 10 cm. The age of the layer is estimated at 20,000 – 18,000 BCE.
- in the lower part of the fawn pack is the main cultural layer 15–20 cm thick. Its age is identified in the range of 15,700 – 13,000 BCE.
- in the lower part of the brownish-pale-yellow pack is the upper cultural layer with artefacts at the level of occurrence of 15–25 cm. Its age is estimated at 13,000 – 12,000 BCE.

Kamennaya Balka 2 was the most thoroughly studied campsite. The researchers identified residential areas, specialized economic zones, foci, clusters of flint artifacts and animal bones in the cultural layers of Balka 2. The basis in the collection of artefacts are primitive tools typical for Kamennobalkovsky culture: tiny plates with a blunt edge, cutters, scrapers, tronke, plates and flakes with areas of retouching, the combination of tools, tip and piercings, chisels and flake tools, toothed notched tools. This campsite is primary one in the unity of several campsites, found in Kamennaya Balka. It presents three cultural layers, which are the remains of three different in time scale late Paleolithic settlements.

== Kamennobalkovsky culture ==
In the opinion of many researchers monuments of Kamennobalkovsky culture and Imereti culture (in certain moment of its development) have very much in common. Imereti culture itself bears some resemblance to Paleolithic period of the Middle East.
