= Olbia (Cilicia) =

Olbia (Ancient Greek: Ὀλβία) was a town of ancient Cilicia, mentioned by Stephanus of Byzantium. William Smith conjectures that Stephanus may have been confused with the town of Olbasa/Olbe.
