= Tanais Archaeological Reserve Museum =

Museum in Rostov, Russia

- Археологический музей-заповедник Танаис
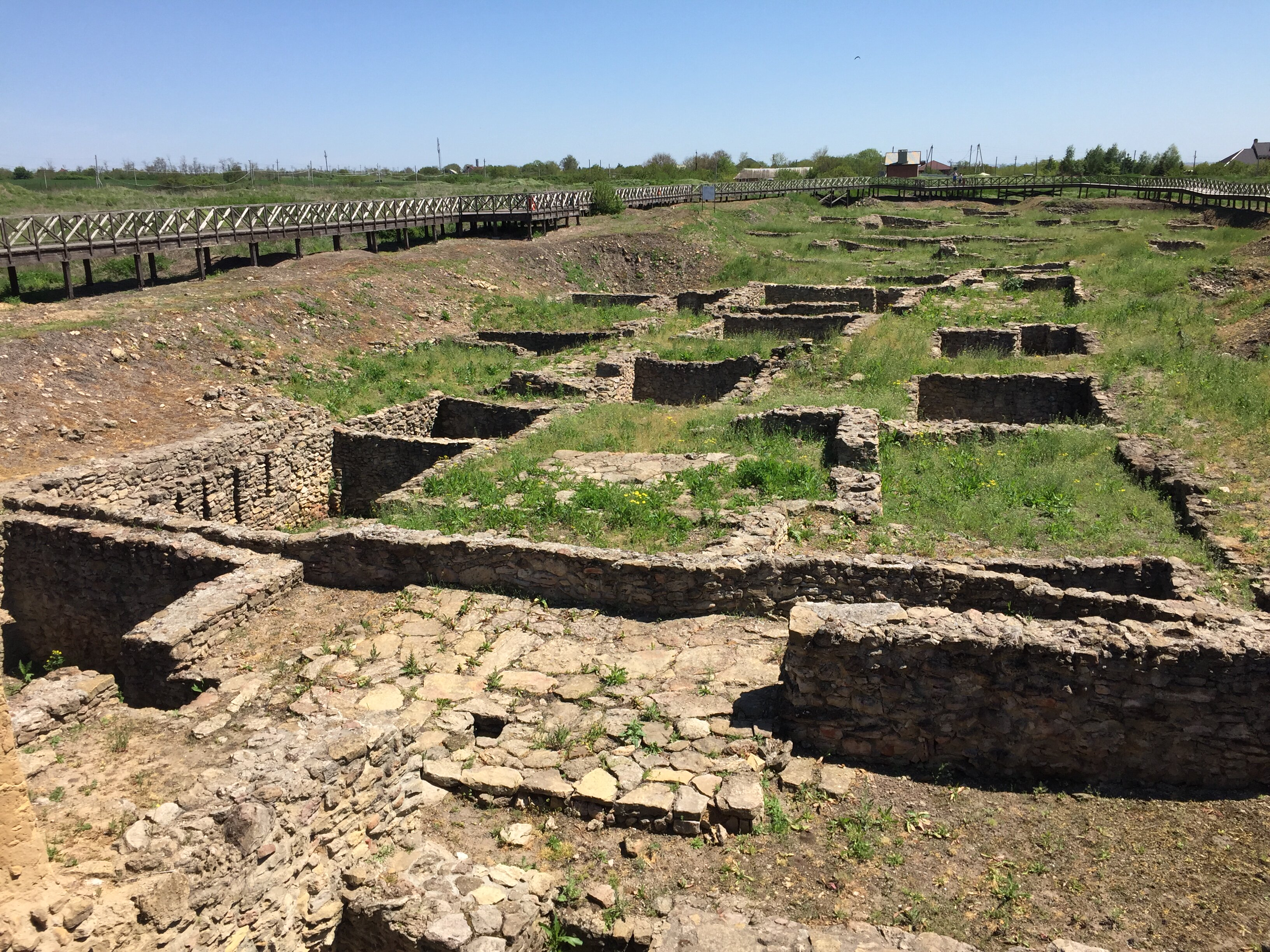
- The acropolis
- Established: 1958
- Coordinates: 47.269°N 39.335°E
- Website: www.museum-tanais.ru

Tanais Archaeological Reserve Museum, or the Archaeological Museum-reserve Tanais (Russian: Археологический музей-заповедник Танаис), is one of the largest historical and archaeological open-air reserve museum in Russia.

It is also the first archeological reserve museum established in Russia. It is based on the site of the ancient city of Tanais. The city, named after the river Tanais (Don), was founded in its mouth at the confluence to Meotida (Azov Sea). The city of Tanais has played a significant role in the political life of cities of the Northern Black Sea Region and the adjacent areas of the Great Steppe for almost eight centuries.

== History ==
Tanais was an ancient city founded in early 3rd century BC by Greek colonists. It became an important center in the steppe region in the 2nd to 3rd century AD, but was abandoned by the 5th century. Later settlements were established nearby but the site itself was not covered by later buildings. The site was identified as Tanais in the early 19th century, and archaeological excavations at the site begun in 1853, which continued into the 20th century.

In 1955, the Academy of Sciences of USSR began a Lower-Don archaeological expedition, which, in collaboration with the Rostov University and the Rostov Museum of Local Lore, began studying the site of the ancient settlement.

In 1958, the Rostov Regional Executive Committee issued a resolution "On the establishment of Tanais Reserve Museum as a branch of the Rostov Regional Museum of Local History." In 1960, to Tanais Archaeological Reserve Museum was handed over land. On August 1, 1961 the museum was opened. In 1981, the Rostov Oblast Executive Committee designated the conservation zones of the reserve with an area of 1,200 hectares. In 1990, the museum-reserve became an independent cultural institution.

Currently, about 40 people work there. A new museum building was built on its territory with the main historical exposition. As a result of excavations, about a tenth of the ancient city, as well as the main territory of the urban necropolis, has been discovered. Visitors can see an open-air exposition, which includes lapidarium and reconstructed ancient buildings (Tanais fortifications, Roman bridge, Meot hut, Polovtsian sanctuary). Museum funds currently number more than 140 thousand units. Unique "Hall of amphora standards" is currently the only collection of open storage of amphoras in Europe.

The Lower-Don archaeological expedition, which since 1993 acquired the status of an international expedition (in collaboration with German Institute of Archeology and the Institute of Archeology of the University of Warsaw), continues to make contribution to the development of the museum-reserve.

In February 2009, Tanais Archaeological Reserve Museum became a candidate to the UNESCO World Heritage List.

== Gallery ==
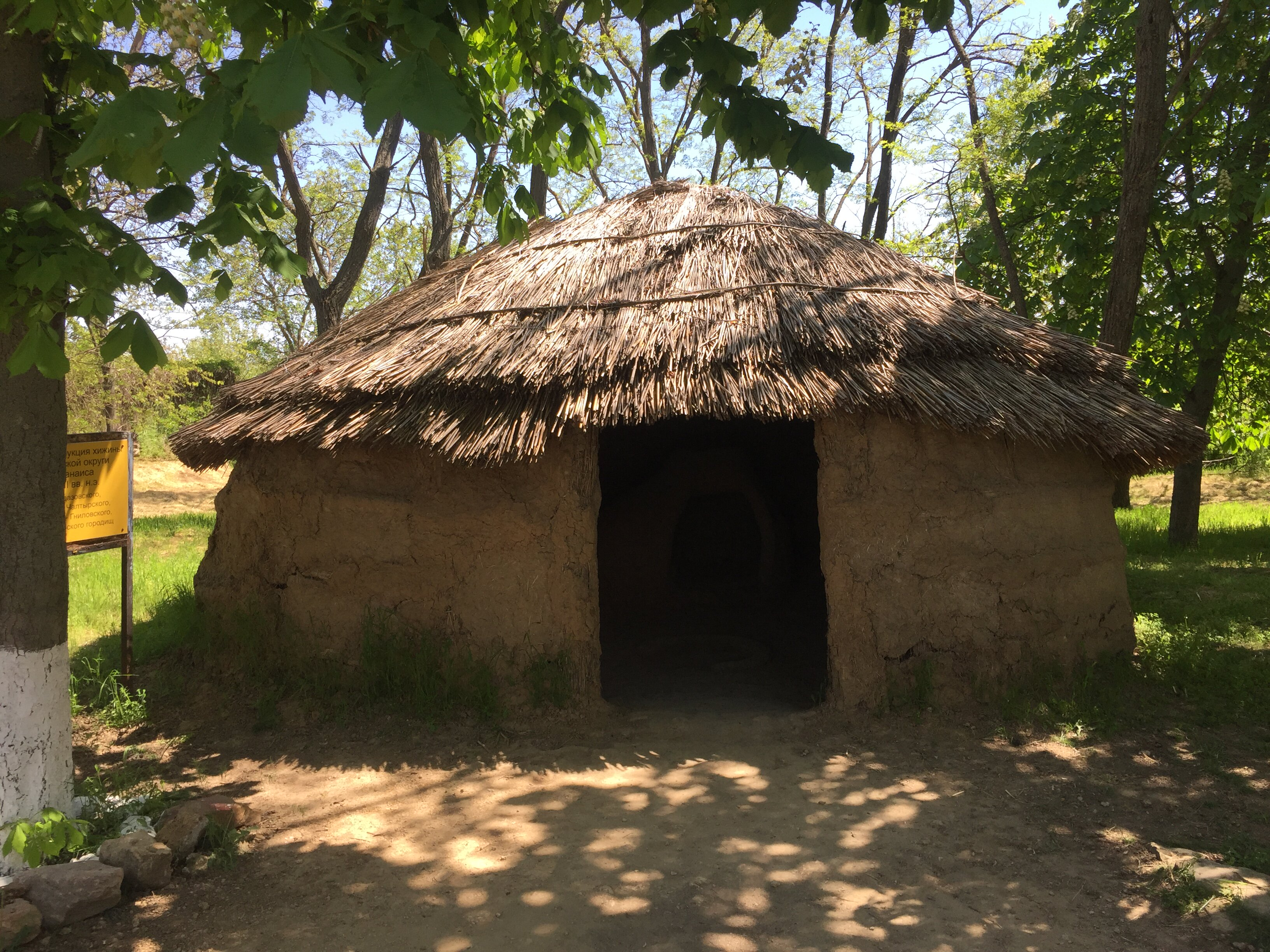
Reconstructed hut

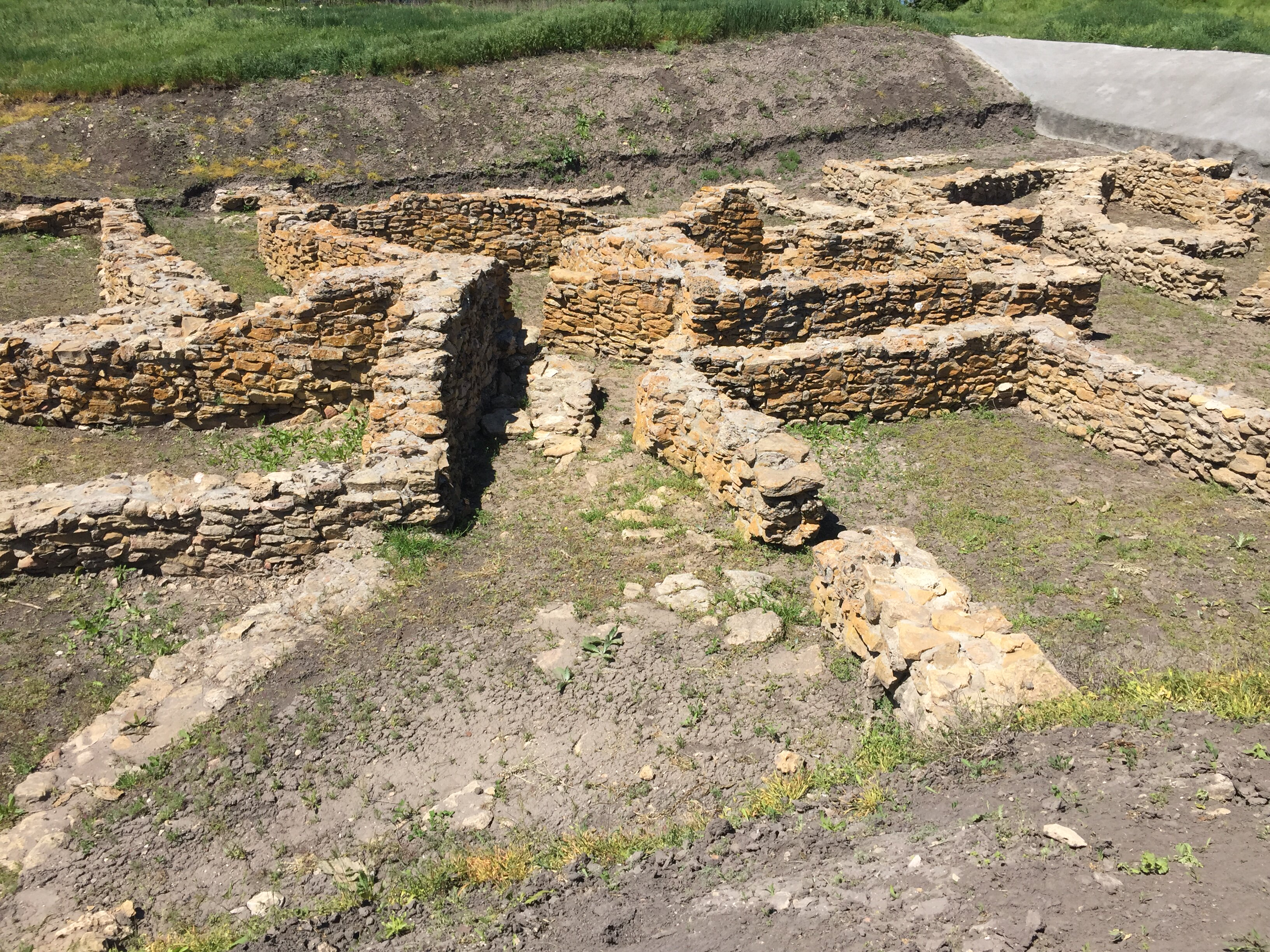
A street near necropolis

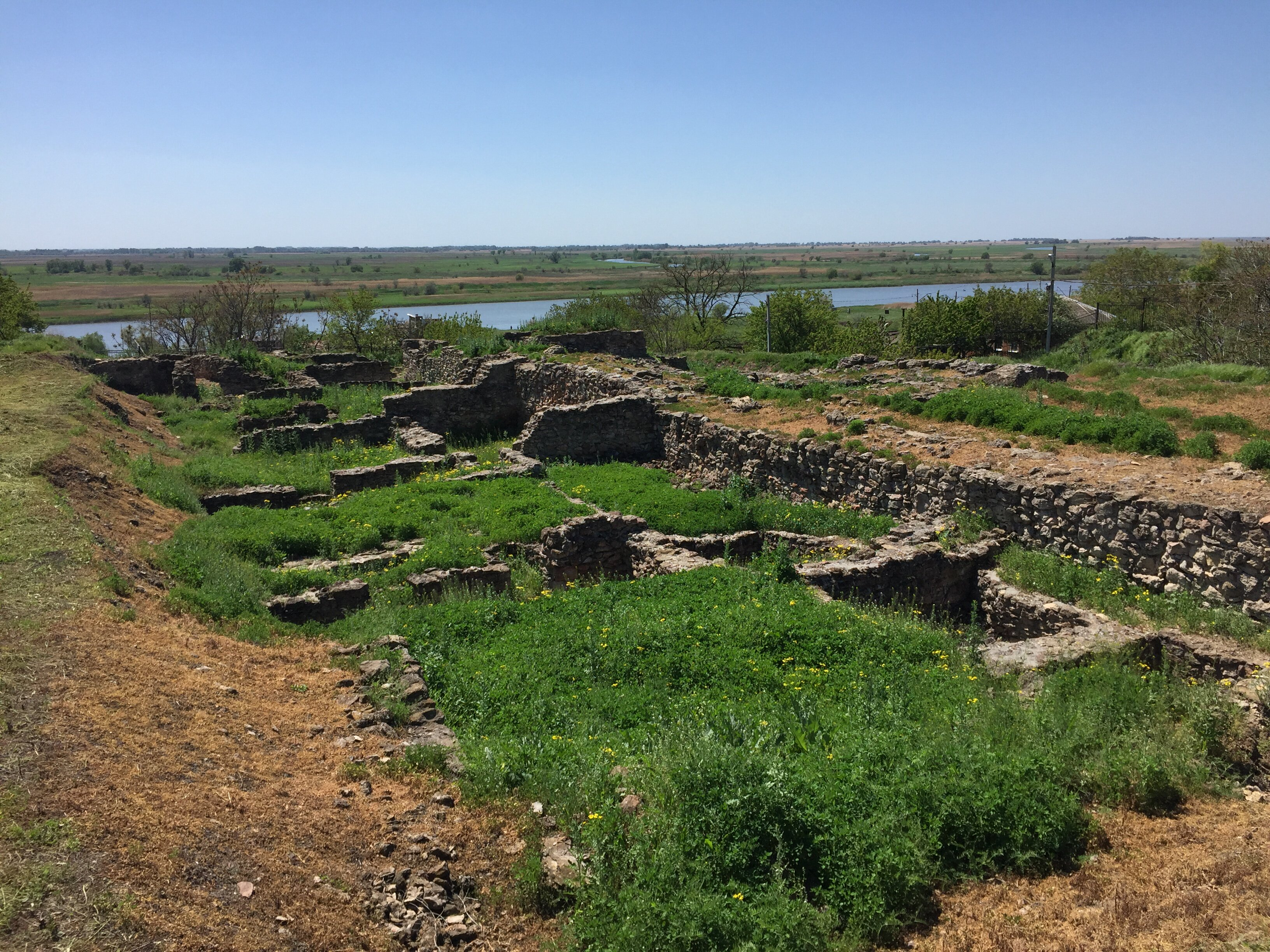
The wall near the sea

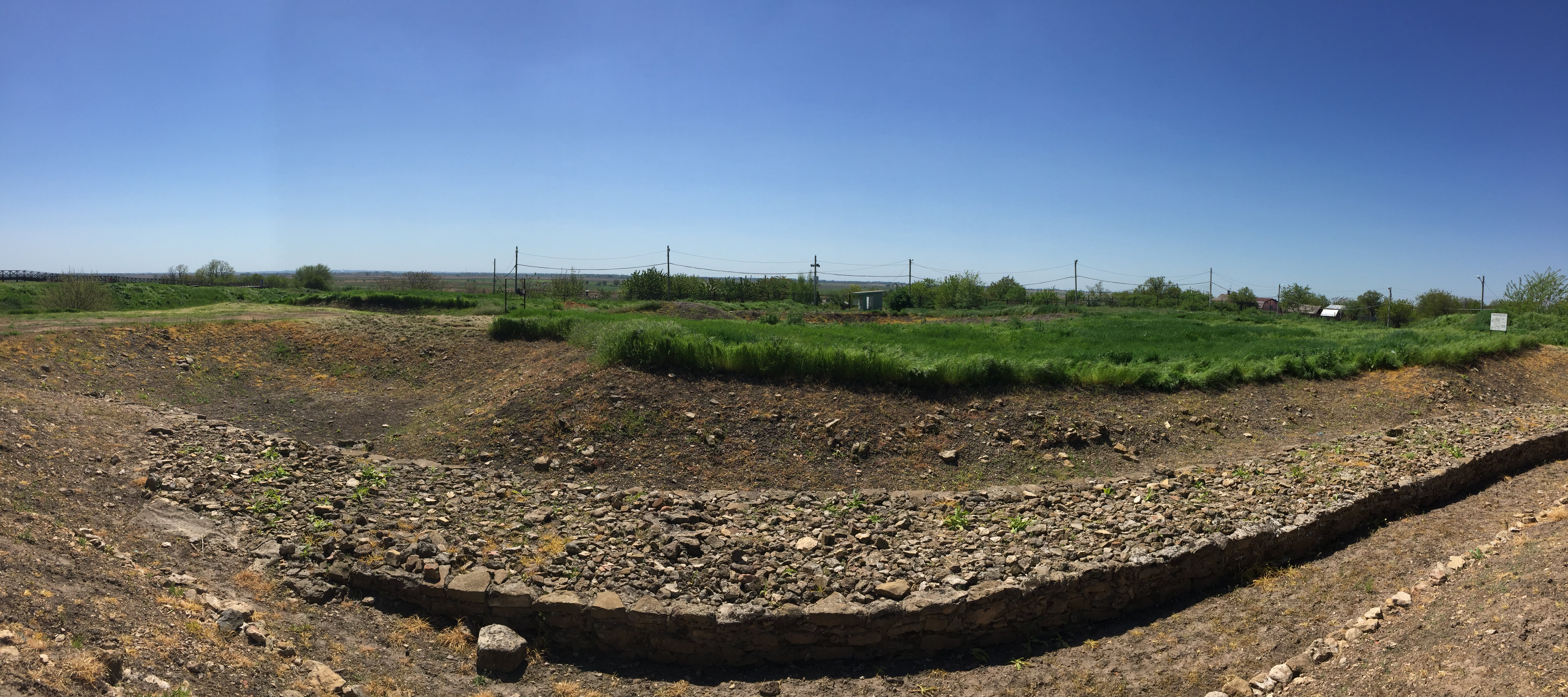
Ruins of the city wall

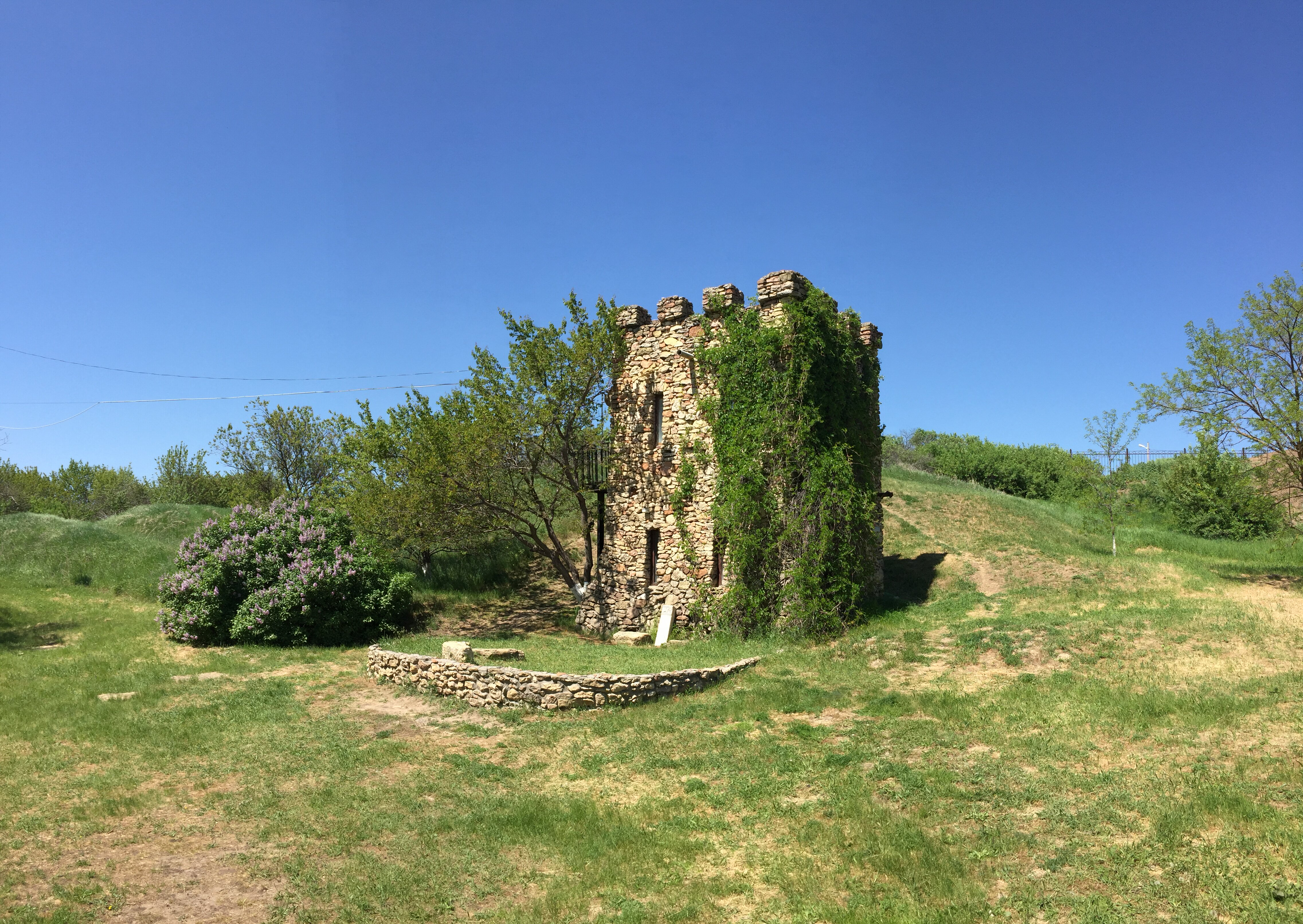
Reconstructed tower
