= Olba =

Olba or OLBA may refer to:

- Olba, Aragon, Spain
- Olba (ancient city), in present-day Turkey
- Beirut–Rafic Hariri International Airport, Lebanon, ICAO airport code OLBA

== See also ==
- Olbas Oil
