= Arsenio Duodo =

15th-century Venetian merchant and politician

Arsenio Duodo was a 15th-century member of the Venetian patrician Duodo family. He led the Venetian navy multiple times and eventually became Consul to Tanais.

== Biography ==
Arsenio Duodo married Francesca Gabriel, daughter of Giovanni Gabriel in 1415. He was Patron for the Convoy of Alexandria in 1412 and again in 1419. The value of the cargo of the three ships of the latter convoy was 80,000 ducats. Duodo was patron of the Convoy of Flanders in 1422, and the Convoy of Aigues Mortes in 1423. In 1431, he was Sopracomito (commander of a galley) in the Venetian navy. In 1434, his daughter Cenone (Nona) Duodo married Giosafat Barbaro.

In July 1436, Arsenio Duodo was elected Consul to Tanais. The captains of the trade galleys initially refused to continue past Constantinople, though they eventually did reach Tana. Initially, Consul Duodo had to stay in Constantinople at his own expense and was not reimbursed by the Senate until two years later. In 1438, the Great Horde under Küchük Muhammad advanced on Tana. Consul Duodo sent his son-in-law Giosafat Barbaro as an emissary to the Tatars to persuade them not to attack Tana.

In 1440, Duodo was Captain of the Convoy of Aigues Mortes. In 1442, he was Podestà of Capodistria. Pirates supported by Alfonso of Aragon became a problem in the Black Sea, and in 1444 Arsenio Duodo was sent with five ships to hunt them. In 1446, he became Rector of Feltre.

In 1448, Duodo was nominated by his son-in-law, Giosafat Barbaro, for the office of Bailo of Constantinople. In 1460, Arsenio Duodo was one of the Councilors of Doge Pasquale Malipiero. He was one of the electors of Doge Cristoforo Moro in 1462.

== Bibliography ==
- Babinger, Franz (1992). Mehmed the Conqueror & His Time. Princeton University Press.
- Doumerc, Bernard (1987). Les Vénitiens à La Tana (Azov) au XVe siècle. Cahiers du monde russe et soviétique, Issue 28, 1987.
- Gullino, Giuseppe (1996). "Le frontiere navali". Enciclopedia Treccani.
- Howorth, Henry Hoyle (1996). History of the Mongols: from the 9th to the 19th century. The University of California.
- Lockhart, Laurence; Morozzo della Rocca, Raimondo; Tiepolo, Maria Francesca (1973). I Viaggi in Persia degli ambasciatori veneti Barbaro e Contarini. Istituto poligrafico dello Stato, Libreria.
- Società geograf ica italiana (1882). Studi biografici e bibliografici sulla storia della geografia in Italia'. Società geografica italiana.
- Storz, Otto-Hermann (2009). Die persische Karte : venezianisch-persische Beziehungen um 1500; Reiseberichte venezianischer Persienreisender.
