= List of Venetian governors of Kotor =

This is a list of Venetian governors of Kotor. The governors of Cattaro (modern Kotor) held the titles of conte (count), capitano (captain), rettore (rector), and provveditore (overseer). Kotor was under Venetian rule between 1420 and 1797.

== List ==
Governor	Period	Notes
Counts (conte and capitano):
Antonio Boccole (fl. 1420–22)	1420 — 1422	Boccole family. first governor, elected on August 24, 1420
Marco Barbarigo (fl. 1388–d. 1428)	1422 — 1423	Barbarigo family.
Stefano Querini (fl. 1423–25)	1423 — 1425	Querini family, son of Guglielmo.
Pietro Duodo (fl. 1425–27)	1425 — 1427	Duodo family.
Zuanne (or Giovanni) Balbi (fl. 1427–29)	1427 — 1429	
Nicolò Pisani (fl. 1429–32)	1429 — 1432	Pisani family.
Antonio Pesaro (fl. 1432–34)	1432 — 1434	
Lorenzo (or Vincenzo) Vitturi (fl. 1434–36)	1434 — 1436	Vitturi family.
Paolo Contarini (fl. 1436–38)	1436 — 1438	Contarini family, son of Lorenzo.
Albano Sagredo (fl. 1438–40)	1438 — 1440	Sagredo family.
Pietro Dalmario (fl. 1440–42)	1440 — 1442	
Leonardo Bembo (fl. 1442–44)	1442 — 1444	Bembo family, son of Andrea.
Zuanne (or Giovanni) Nani (fl. 1444–47)	1444 — 1447	Nani family, son of Costantino.
Jacopo (or Giacomo) Morosini (fl. 1447–49)	1447 — 1449	Morosini family, son of Francesco.
Zuanne (or Giovanni) Lion (fl. 1449–51)	1449 — 1451	
Lodovico Barbo/Baffo (fl. 1451–53)	1451 — 1453	Barbo family.
Zuanne (or Giovanni) Barbo (fl. 1454–56)	1454 — 1456	Barbo family, son of Paolo.
Alvise Duodo (fl. 1457–59)	1457 — 1459	Duodo family, son of Pietro.
Antonio Donà (or Donato) (fl. 1459–62)	1459 — 1462	Donà family, son of Benedetto.
Paolo Priuli (fl. 1462–65)	1462 — 1465	Priuli family, son of Giacomo.
Alvise (or Lodovico) Bon (fl. 1465–67)	1465 — 1467	son of Giovanni.
Eustachio Balbi (fl. 1467–69)	1467 — 1469	son of Bernardo.
Bertuccio Gabriel (fl. 1469–72)	1469 — 1472	son of Giacomo.
Michele Michiel (fl. 1472–74)	1472 — 1474	son of Francesco.
Giovanni Donato (fl. 1474–77)	1474 — 1477	son of Alvise Donato.
Francesco Lippomano (fl. 1477–80)	1477 — 1480	Lippomano family.
(rettori and provveditori):

Governors (rettore and provveditore)

== Sources ==
- Archivio veneto. A spese della R. Deputazione. 1879. p. 111.
- Manuale del Regno di Dalmazia. G. Wodtzka. 1875.
- "Rettorato: Cattaro". Archived from the original on November 1, 2014.
