= List of Venetian governors of Dulcigno =

Count and captain of Dulcigno
- Latin: Comes et Capitaneus Dulcinii; Italian: Conte e Capitano di Dulcigno
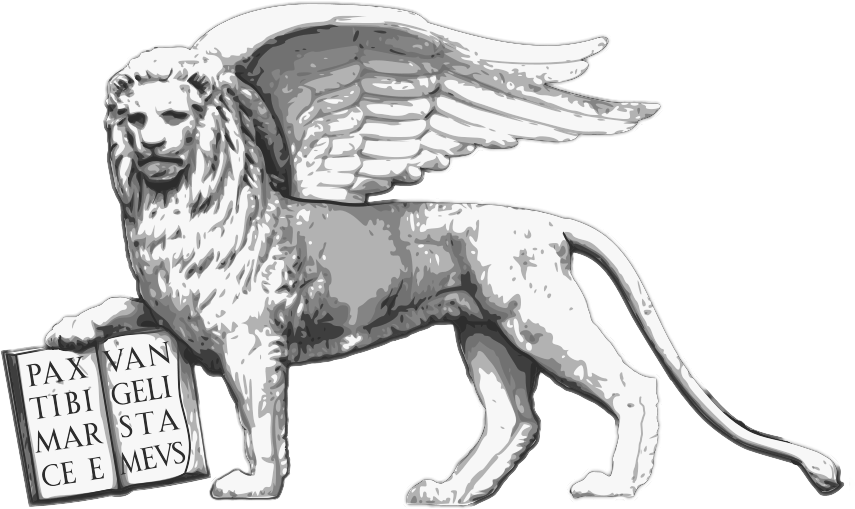
- Lion of Saint Mark symbol of the Republic of Venice
- Inaugural holder: Nicolò Foscolo
- Formation: 1405
- Abolished: 1571

Dulcigno, modern day Ulcinj (Albanian: Ulqini), was in Venetian Albania between 1405–1412 and 1421–1571. During this time, the Venetian governors of Dulcigno held the title of Count and Captain (Italian: Conte e Capitano di Dulcigno, Latin: Comes et Capitaneus Dulcinii) or provveditore (overseer).

== List of governors ==
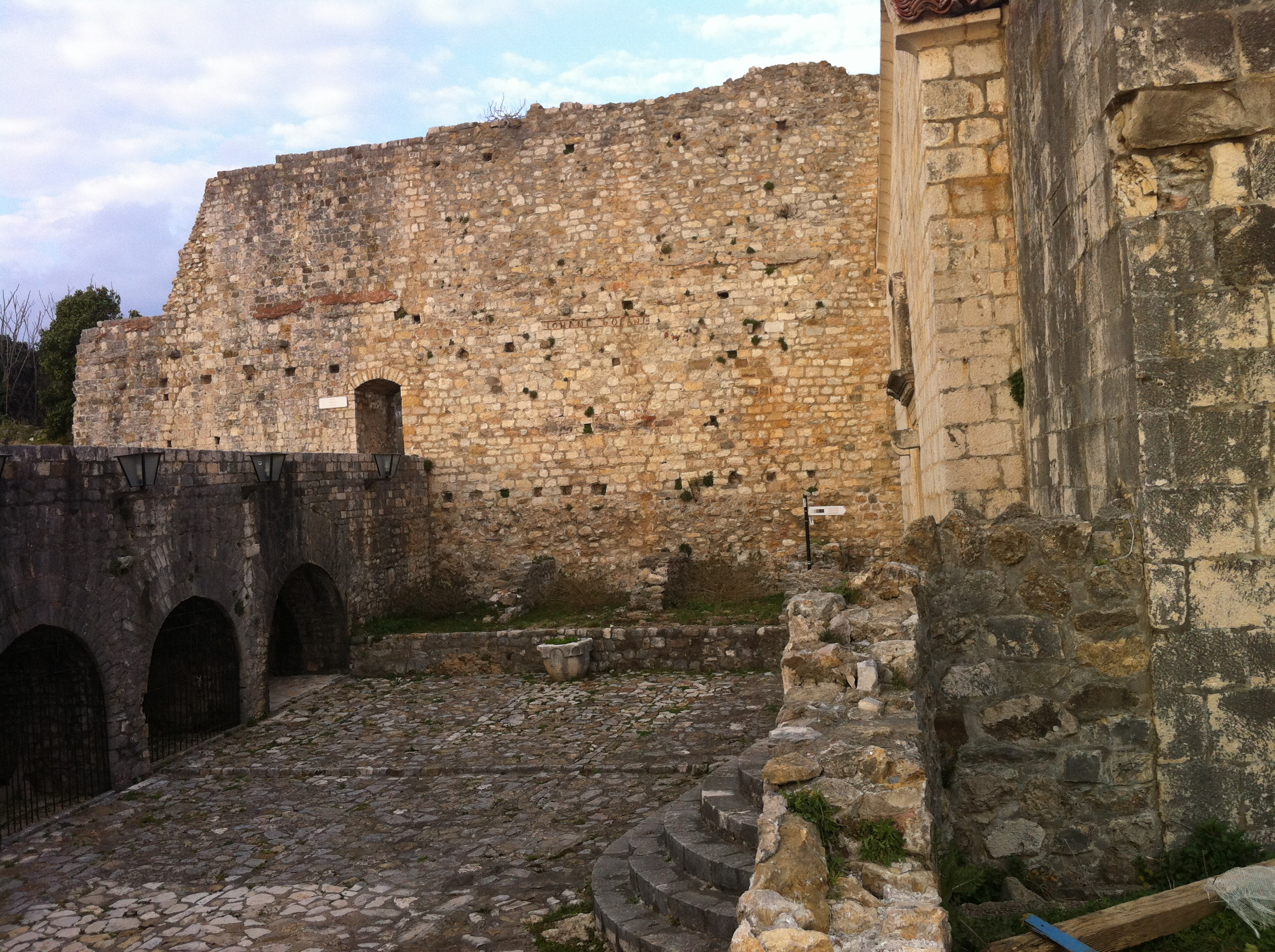
Wall in the Castle of Dulcigno, that bear the name of count Johani Bollani (Giovanni Bollani)

Family coat of arms	Name	Period	Title	Notes
	Nicolò Foscolo	1405 – ?	first count and captain	
	Francesco Guoro	1422 – ?	provveditore	after Adrea Querini refused
	Nicolo Miani	1423 – ?	provveditore	
	Pietro Diedo	1424 – ?	provveditore	
	Giacomo Civran	1425 – ?	provveditore	
	Andrea di Donato qu Fantin	1427 – ?	provveditore	
	Andrea Arimondo	1428 – ?	provveditore	
	Antonio Contarini	1437 – 1939	count and captain	
	Pietro Balastro	1439 – 1441	count and captain	
	Iacopo Nani	1441 – 1442	podestà, count and captain	
	Nicolò da Mosto	1443 – 1444	count and captain	
	Andrea Boldù	1444 – 1446	count and captain	
	Leonardo Calbo	1446 – 1448	count and captain	
	Nicolò Salamon	1448 – 1450	count and captain	
	Giovanni Bollani	1450 – 1452	count and captain	
	Pietro Soranzo	1452 – 1456	count and captain	
	Iacopo (Giacomo) Miani	1456 – 1459	count and captain	
	Leonardo Zane	1459 – 1462	count and captain	
	Marco Marcello	1462 – 1465	count and captain	
	Michele Darmer	1465 – 1468	count and captain	
	Giovanni Lombardo	1468 – 1471	podestà, count and captain	
	Alvise Moro	1470 – 1473	count and captain	
	Iacopo (Giacomo) Tagliapietra	1473 – 1476	count and captain	
	Tommaso (Toma) Salamon	1476 – 1479	count and captain	
	Andrea Michiel	1479 – 1481	podestà, count and captain	
	Pietro Tiepolo	1481 – 1485	count and captain	
	Antonio Minotto	1485	count and captain	
	Pietro Venier	1486 – 1489	count and captain	
	Carlo Salamon	1489 –1492	count and captain	
	Antonio Bon	1492 – 1494	count and captain	
	Marco Marcello	1494 – 1497	count and captain	
	Pietro Nadal	1497 – 1500	count and captain	
	Francesco Tagliapietra	1500 – 1503	count and captain	after Filippo Cocco, Girolamo Pisani and Lorezno Foscarini refused
	Alvise Baffo	1503 – 1505	count and captain	
	Alvise Moro	1505 – 1507	count and captain	after Daniele Moro refused
	Stefano Lion	1507 – 1510	count and captain	
	Pietro Bondumier	1510 – 1513	podestà dhe kapiten	after Iacopo Pizzamano refused
	Andrea Marcello	1513 – 1515	count and captain	
	Iacopo Loredan	1515 – 1517	count and captain	after Bernardino Venier refused
	Francesco Corner	1517 – 1520	count and captain	after Girolamo da Pesaro and Marco Querini refused
	Alessandro Permarino	1520 – ?	count and captain	
	Alvise Cicogna	1531 – ?	podestà	
	Baldassare Condumier (Bondumier)	c. 1544	count and captain	

== See also ==
- List of mayors of Ulcinj
- List of Venetian governors of Kotor
