= Duodo family =

Venetian patrician family

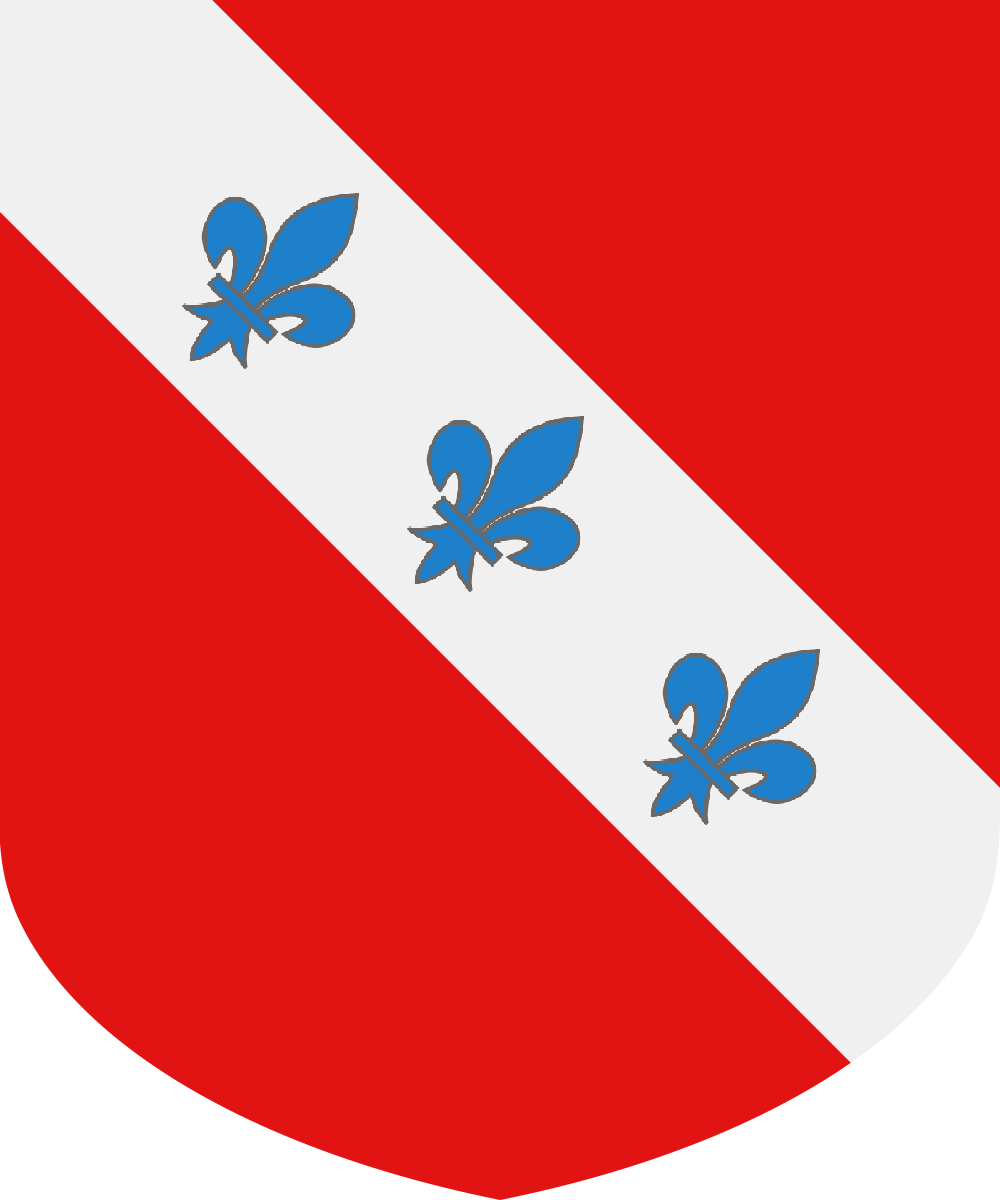
The Duodo coat of arms

The Duodo family was a Venetian patrician family, numbered among the so-called Case Nuove. A long-established Venetian family, it was founded in the parish of Santa Maria Zobenigo. Its origins are unclear: it may have been Slavonian, Peloponnesian, or German. From the 11th century, it provided commanders to the armies and procurators of San Marco. It was included among the nobility at the Serrata del Maggior Consiglio. Tradition says the Duodo family was involved in trade with the Far East.

== History ==
The Duodo were one of the most ancient families in Venetia, with records dating back to 1043 when a Fantino Duodo served as Galley Captain in the fleet of Domenico Contarini during the conquest of Zara. The family's origins remain a subject of historical debate, with some sources tracing them to Morea, near the Gulf of Lodrino. They secured a distinguished place among the Venetian nobles, gaining a seat at the Council of Ten and producing a long lineage of prominent figures.

Among them was Nicolò Duodo, a senator and ambassador to various princes, active before 1350. Luca Duodo commanded the Venetian fleet with supreme authority in 1354, during the wars that defined La Serenissima's maritime dominance. Christoforo, after serving as a general on the Po River, was later rewarded with the high office of Porpora Procuratoria.

As General of the Great Galleys at Curzolari, Francesco displayed extraordinary valor by disrupting enemy formations, breaking through their ranks and securing what became one of the most decisive victories for Christendom over its adversaries. In recognition of his achievements, his brother Domenico was honored as a senator, known for his unwavering integrity and wisdom.

Pietro Duodo, a knight and ambassador, who in 1495 had led a squadron of Albanian cavalrymen at the Battle of Taro, transformed his mountainous estate in Monselice into a place of worship, constructing seven finely adorned churches, one of which stood out in both grandeur and sanctity, enriched with relics of Holy Bodies and other sacred remains.

In later generations, Girolamo Duodo represented Veneto as an ambassador at the Court of Spain, where his prudence and diplomatic skill strengthened the Republic's influence abroad.

The Duodo family resided at Santa Maria Zobenigo. According to Gallicciolli, the palace suffered severe damage in the great fire of December 3, 1741. Eventually, ownership passed on to the Barbarigo family. By 1808, the last family heir, Carlo, resided at Palazzo Duodo.

== Sons of Pietro Duodo of San Angelo ==
=== Cristoforo Duodo ===
Cristoforo Duodo was Captain of the Sestiere of San Marco in 1402. In 1405, he married Beriola Venier, daughter of Benedetto Venier.

=== Vettore Duodo ===
Vettore Duodo married Cristina Valaresso, daughter of Vettore Valaresso in 1405. He was Captain of the Sestiere of San Marco in 1405 and 1407. Duodo alse served as Giudice Creta in 1407. He was Patron for the Convoy of Romania in 1413 and 1417. In 1424, he was Podesta of Este. In 1429, he was Sopracomito of a galley and Vice-Captain of the Squadron of the Gulf, serving under Andrea Mocenigo during the Siege of Thessalonica (1422–1430). On 1 July 1429, Mocenigo attacked the Ottoman ships at Gallipoli, but although he led his flagship to break through the palisade protecting the Ottoman anchorage, the other Venetian vessels did not follow, forcing Mocenigo to withdraw with heavy casualties. The five captains were imprisoned, and then in January 1430. Vittore Duodo was fined and imprisoned for a year.

Vettore Duodo was Patron for the Convoy for Tana in 1431. From 1440 to 1441 he was Bailo of Trebizond. Duodo was part of a Zonta for the Venetian Senate in 1453. In 1454, he was Podesta of Chioggia. In 1457, Duodo was one of the 41 senators chosen to act as electors, who selected Pasquale Malipiero as Doge. In 1458, he was Proveditor Salis.

=== Marco Duodo ===
Marco Duodo married Elena Viaro, daughter of Fantino Viaro in 1414. He was elected Consul to Tana in 1438. The Tatars attacked Tana in 1442, setting fire to the Venetian quarter, though many of the people survived due to the actions of Consul Duodo. The fire started in the bazaar near the fortress and was fanned by a strong north wind. Four breaches were made in the city walls, one by Giosafat Barbaro, for people to escape, but even then women and children needed to be lowered over the walls by rope. The fire burned for three hours until a combination of human efforts and rain extinguished it and over four hundred people died and the goods warehouses were destroyed. In 1442, there was also concern over the Turks raiding Venetian shipping. Between that and the siege and fire at Tana, the new Consul Pietro Pesaro was stranded in Caffa for several weeks at his own expense before he was able to relieve Marco Duodo.

Marco Duodo became an Official of the Razon Guerra in 1442. He served as Consul to Tana again in 1447. Duodo was part of a Zonta for the Venetian Senate in 1456.

=== Tommaso Duodo ===
Tommaso Duodo was elected Capitan of Ganzarolore in 1411. He was Patron for the Convoy of Flanders in 1412. He married Elena Civran, daughter of Pietro Civran in 1414. In 1414, he endorsed Girolamo De Canal for Patron for the Galley of Flanders. Duodo was Patron for the Convoy for Romania in 1420, the Convoy for Beirut in 1421.

In 1431, Tommaso Duodo was Sopracomito of a galley serving in a fleet of 16 galleys under Pietro Loredan, during a war with Milan. The Venetian force was augmented by 5 galleys from their ally the Republic of Florence, under the command of Paolo Rucellai. Loredan was ordered to sail into the Tyrrhenian Sea, join with the Florentines, and capture Genoa. They were joined by ships of Genoese exiles, led by Giacomo Adorno and Antonio Fieschi. On the morning of the 27th, the galleys of Tommaso Duodo and Dario Malipiero, sent as scouts, sighted the enemy fleet of twenty-five galleys, commanded by Admiral Francesco Spinola. The battle took place near Santa Margherita, in the Gulf of Rapallo. The Venetians won after a fierce battle that lasted two hours, during which the enemy commander was captured.

In 1438, Tommaso Duodo was a member of the Venetian Senate. He was Sopra Aqua Dolce in 1440. In 1448 and 1452, Duodo was elected to the Avogadoria de Comùn.

=== Arsenio Duodo ===
Arsenio Duodo married Francesca Gabriel, daughter of Giovanni Gabriel in 1415. He was Patron for the Convoy of Alexandria in 1412 and again in 1419. The value of the cargo of the three ships of the latter convoy was 80,000 ducats. Duodo was patron of the Convoy of Flanders in 1422, and the Convoy of Aigues Mortes in 1423. In 1431, he was Sopracomito (commander of a galley) in the Venetian navy. In 1434, his daughter Cenone (Nona) Duodo married Giosafat Barbaro.

In July 1436, Arsenio Duodo was elected Consul to Tana. The captains of the trade galleys initially refused to continue past Constantinople, though they eventually did reach Tana. Initially, Consul Duodo had to stay in Constantinople at his own expense and was not reimbursed by the Senate until two years later. In 1438, the Great Horde under Küchük Muhammad advanced on Tana. Consul Duodo sent his son-in-law Giosafat Barbaro as an emissary to the Tatars to persuade them not to attack Tana.

In 1440, Duodo was captain of the Convoy of Aigues Mortes. In 1442, he was Podestà of Capodistria. Pirates supported by Alfonso of Aragon became a problem in the Black Sea, and in 1444 Arsenio Duodo was sent with five ships to hunt them. In 1446, he became Rector of Feltre. In 1448, Duodo was nominated by his son-in-law, Giosafat Barbaro, for the office of Bailo of Constantinople. In 1460, Arsenio Duodo was one of the Councilors of Doge Pasquale Malipiero. He was one of the electors of Doge Cristoforo Moro in 1462.

=== Leone Duodo ===
Leone Duodo was Captain of the Sestiere of Castello in 1419. Leone Duodo was Patron for the Convoy of Aigues Mortes in 1426 and 1427, the Convoy of Beirut in 1430, the Convoy of Alexandria and Beirut in 1431, the Convoy of Romania, Tana, and Trebizond in 1433, the Convoy of Flanders in 1434, the Convoy of Beirut again in 1434, and the Convoy of Tana in 1438. Duodo became part of the Venetian Senate in 1456. In 1459, Leone Duodo was Duke of Crete. In 1463, he was one of the Councilors of Doge Cristoforo Moro. In 1464, Duodo was Podesta of Brescia.

=== Luca Duodo ===
Luca Duodo was patron of the Convoy of Flanders in 1424 and the Convey of Romanie in 1426 and 1428. He was Patron for the Convoy of Corfu and Crete in 1429, the Convoy of Flanders again in 1430, the Convoy of Alexandria and Beirut in 1431, and the Convoy of Syria in 1433 and 1435.

In 1438, he was Podesta of Belluno. Luca Duodo married twice; to Anna Duodo, daughter of Michele Duodo in 1417 and to Oria Bon, daughter of Alessandro Bon in 1425. In his 1442 will, Luca Duodo his sons several properties in Venice and Padua.

== Other Notable Members ==
Leonardo Duodo, member of the Council from 1265 to 1302.

Simeone Duodo and Pietro Duodo, Leonardo's heirs, lenders to the State in 1379.

Pietro Duodo, commander of the army on Lake Garda until 1483 and in 1495 leader of the Albanian knights during the Taro campaign; he made a pilgrimage to the church and seven chapels he built in Monselice.

Francesco Duodo (1518-1592), admiral, general commander of the Battle of Lepanto in 1571, later became procurator of San Marco.

Domenico Duodo, Francesco's brother, obtained the same position after Francesco's death.

Pietro Duodo, son of the former, a learned man and honored with many embassies, who, upon returning from Poland in 1588, rebuilt the Duodo Palace near Santa Maria Zobenigo on the future Fondamenta Duodo with the architect Vincenzo Scamozzi; he built the sanctuary of the seven churches in Monselice and died in 1611.

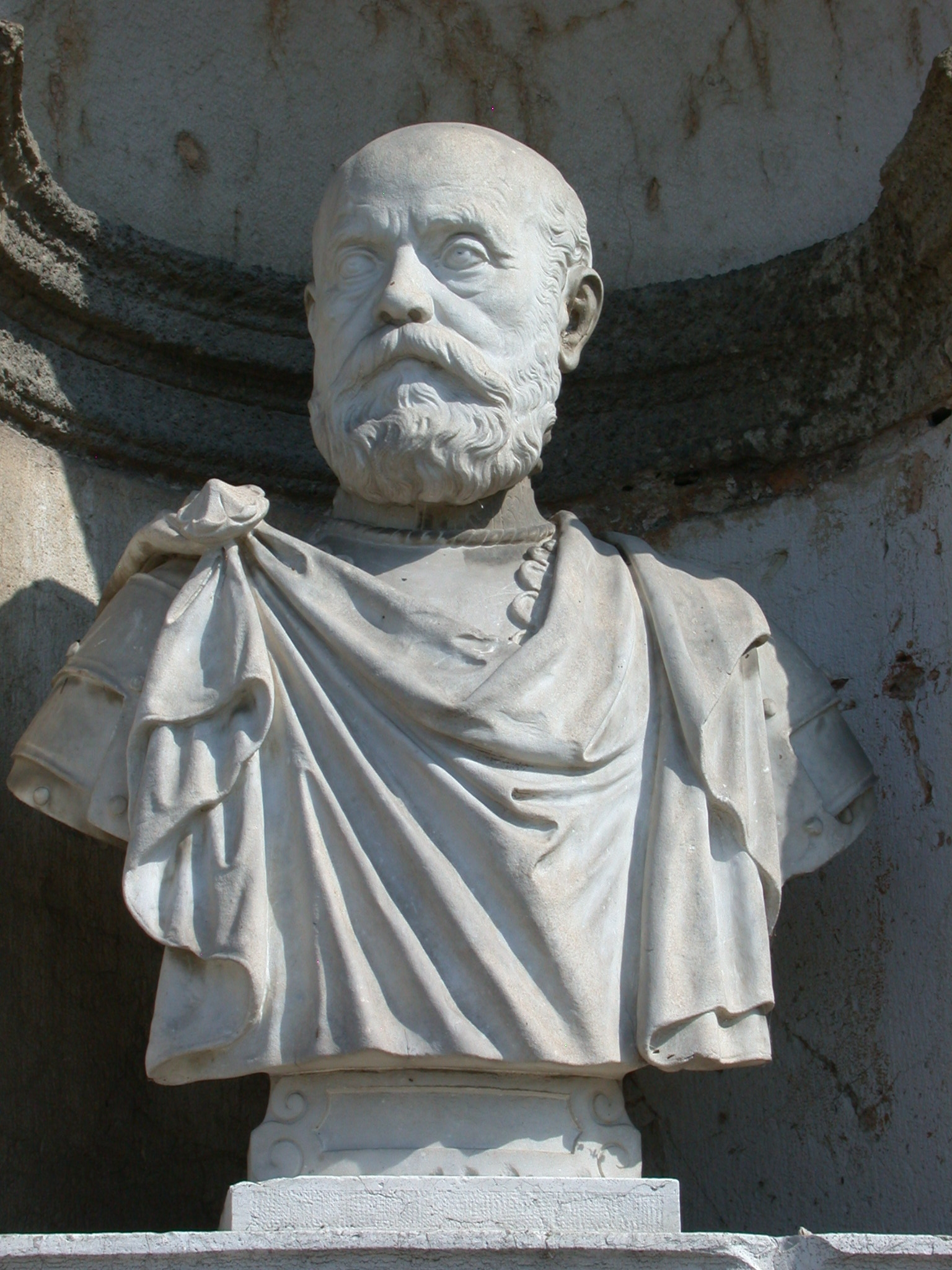
Francesco Duodo

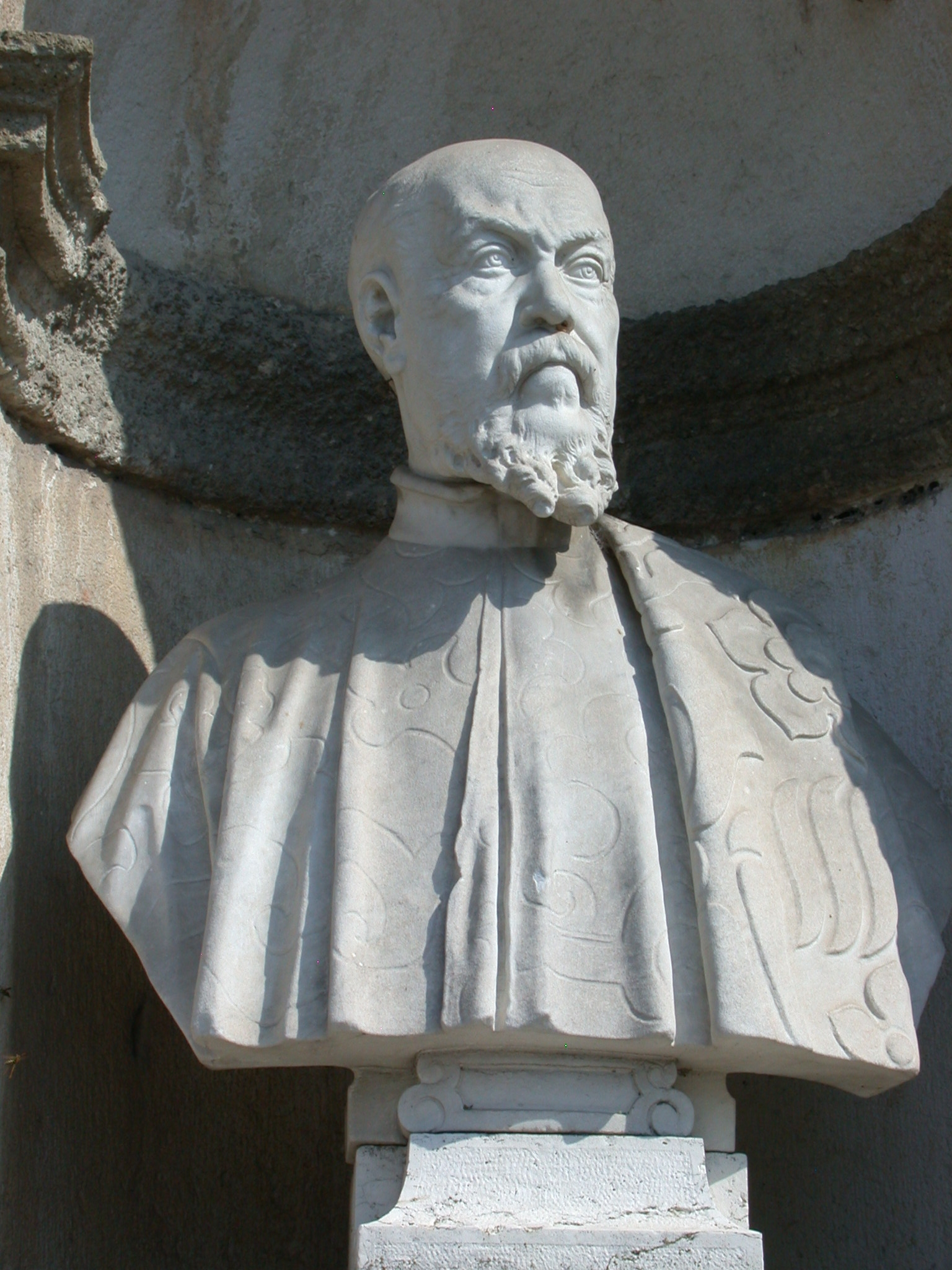
Domenico Duodo

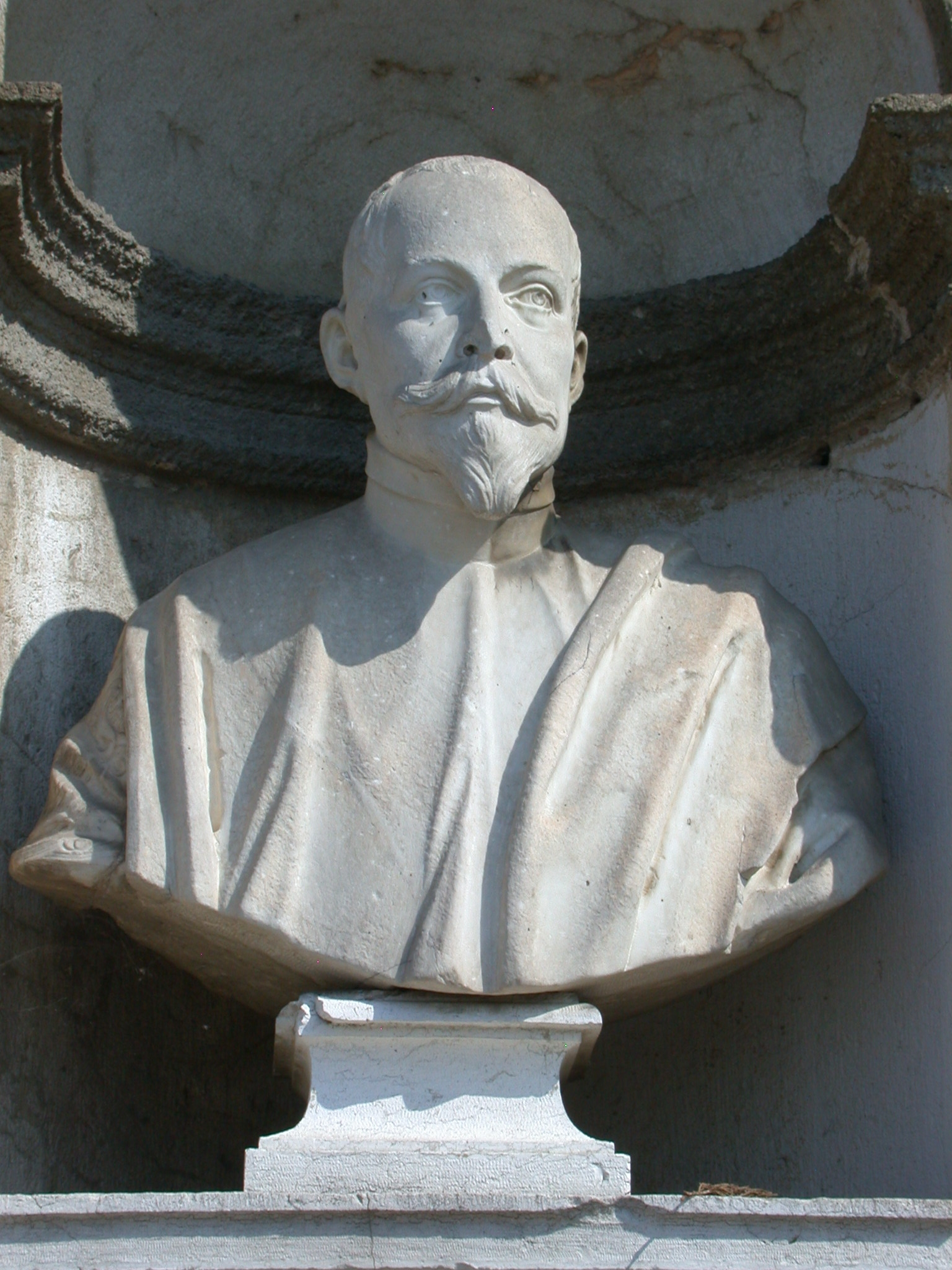
Pietro Duodo

== Architecture ==
The Duodo family was connected to several buildings

- Palazzo Duodo, in Santa Croce
- Palazzo Duodo a San Fantin, in San Marco
- Palazzo Duodo a Sant'Angelo, in San Marco
- Palazzo Duodo Balbi Valier, in San Marco
- Villa Duodo, in Monselice
- Villa Tiepolo, Duodo, Nalon, Grande, in Mirano
- Villa Duodo, Trevisanato, Melichi, Zoppolato, in Mogliano Veneto.
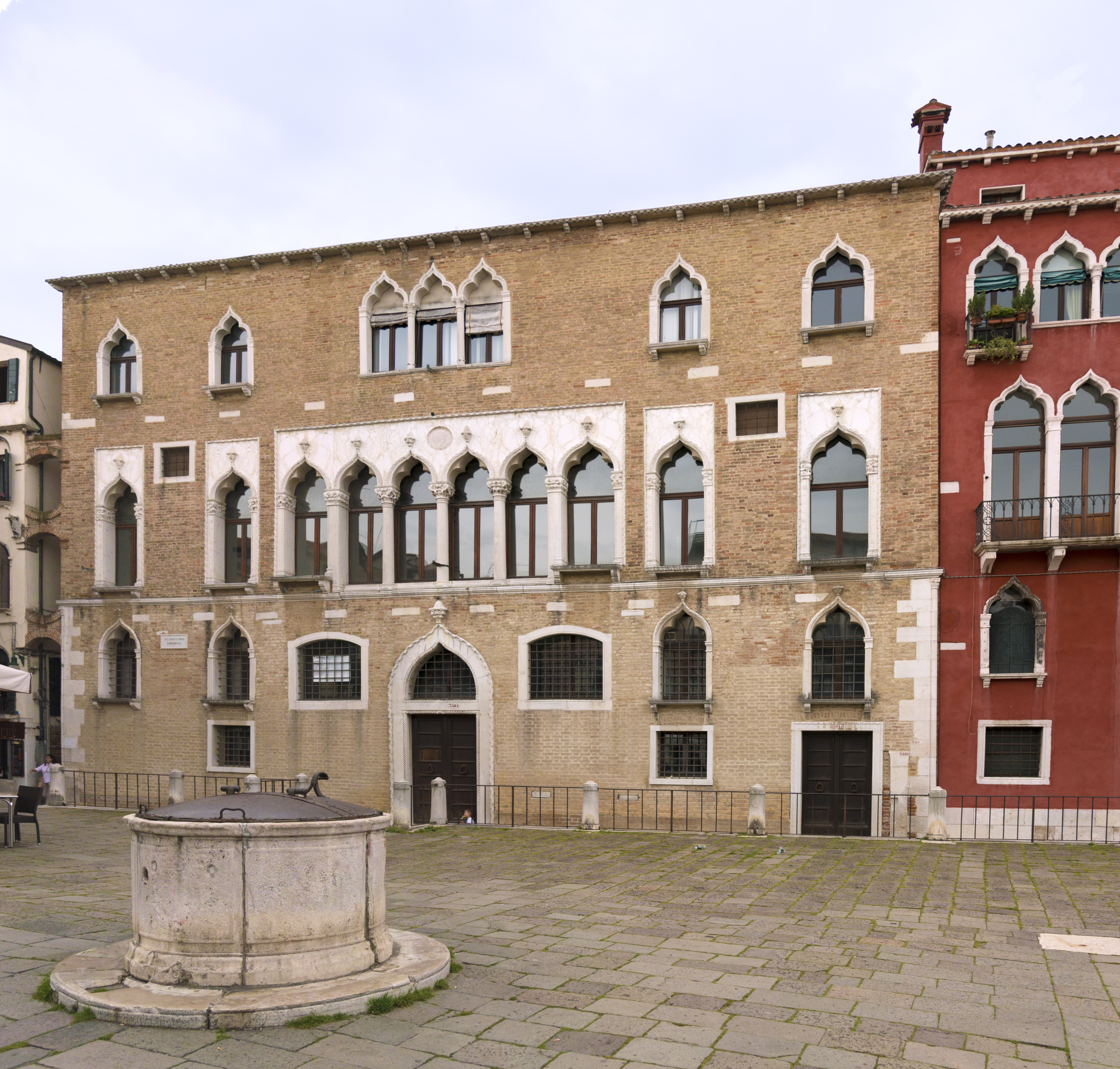
Facade of Palazzo Duodo in Campo Sant'Angelo

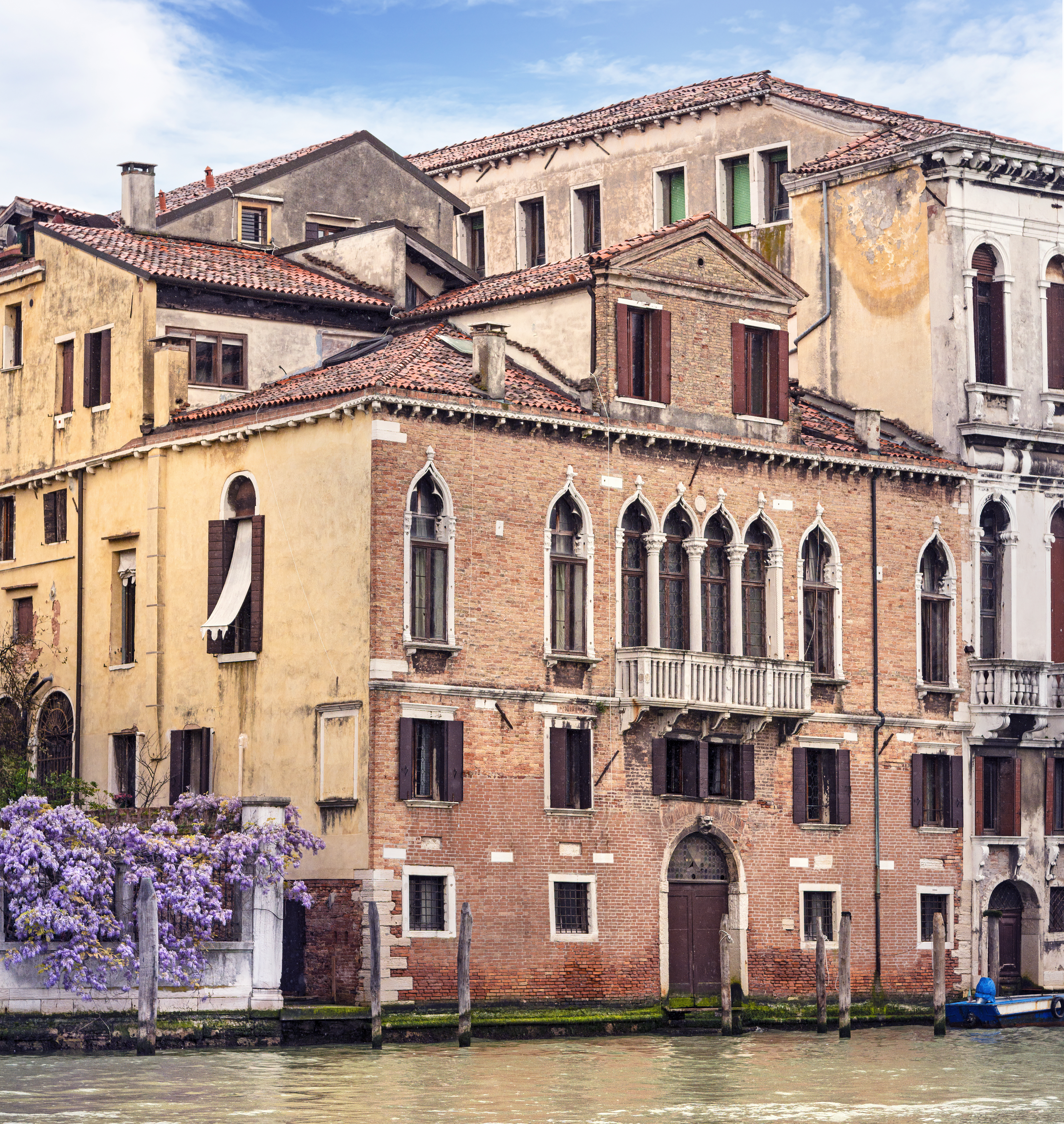
Palazzo Duodo in Santa Croce

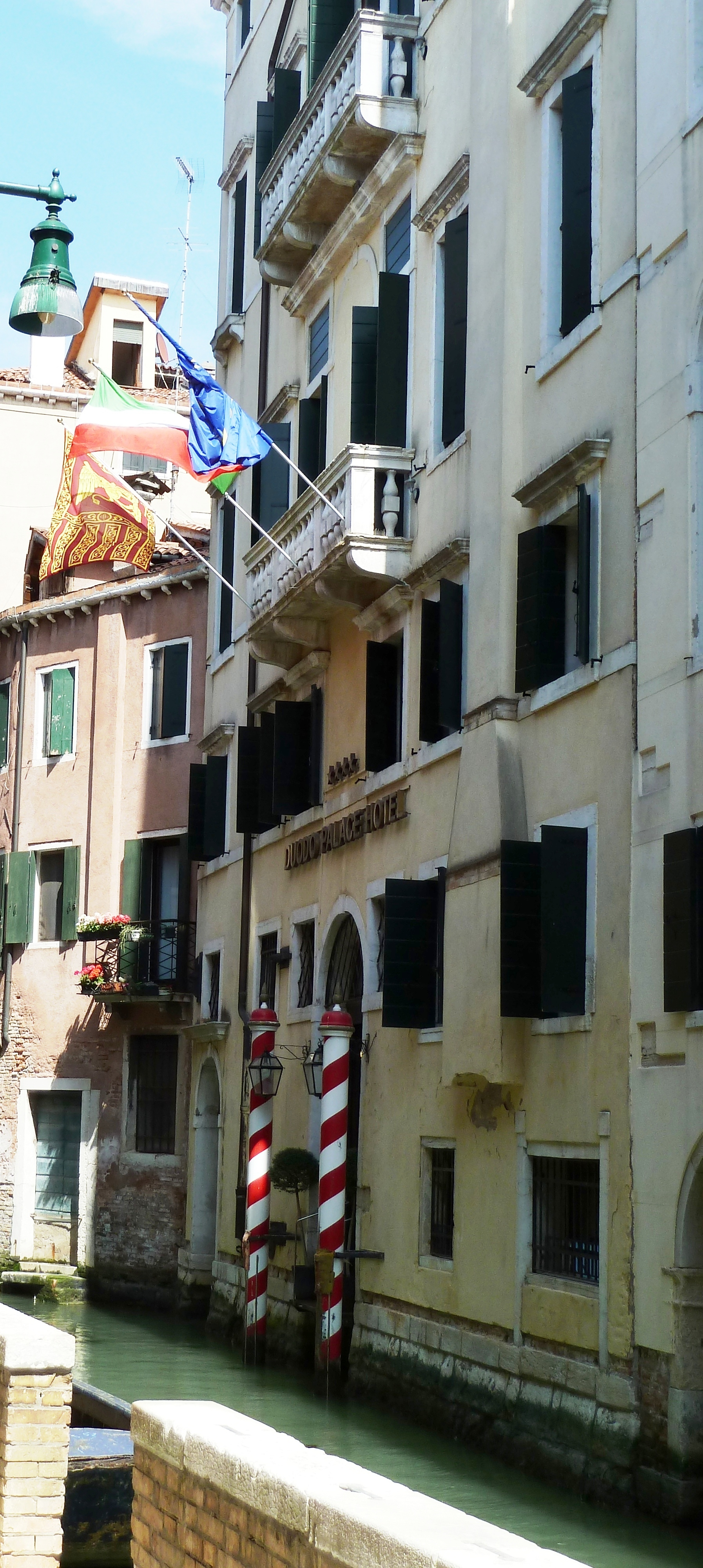
Palazzo Duodo in Sant'Angelo

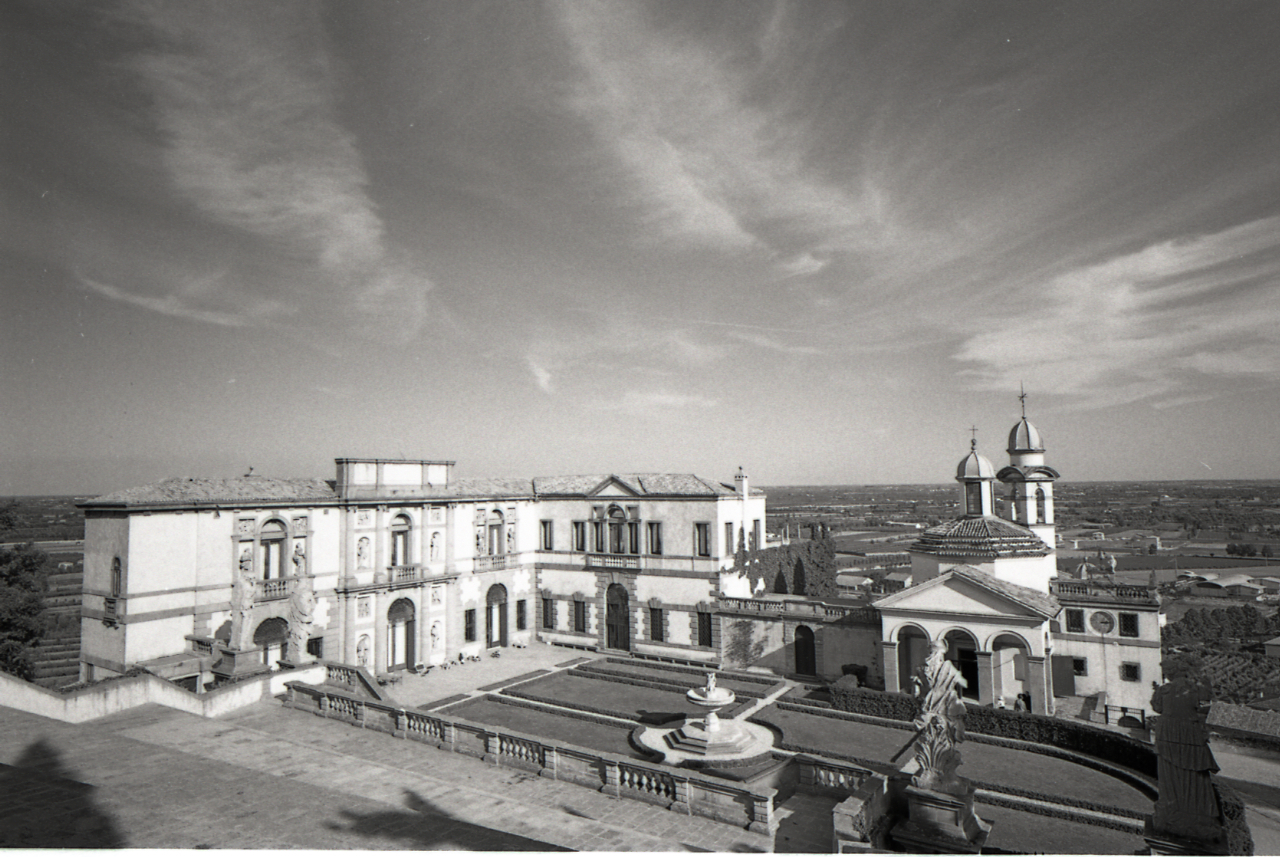
Villa Duodo in Monselice (photo by Paolo Monti, 1967)

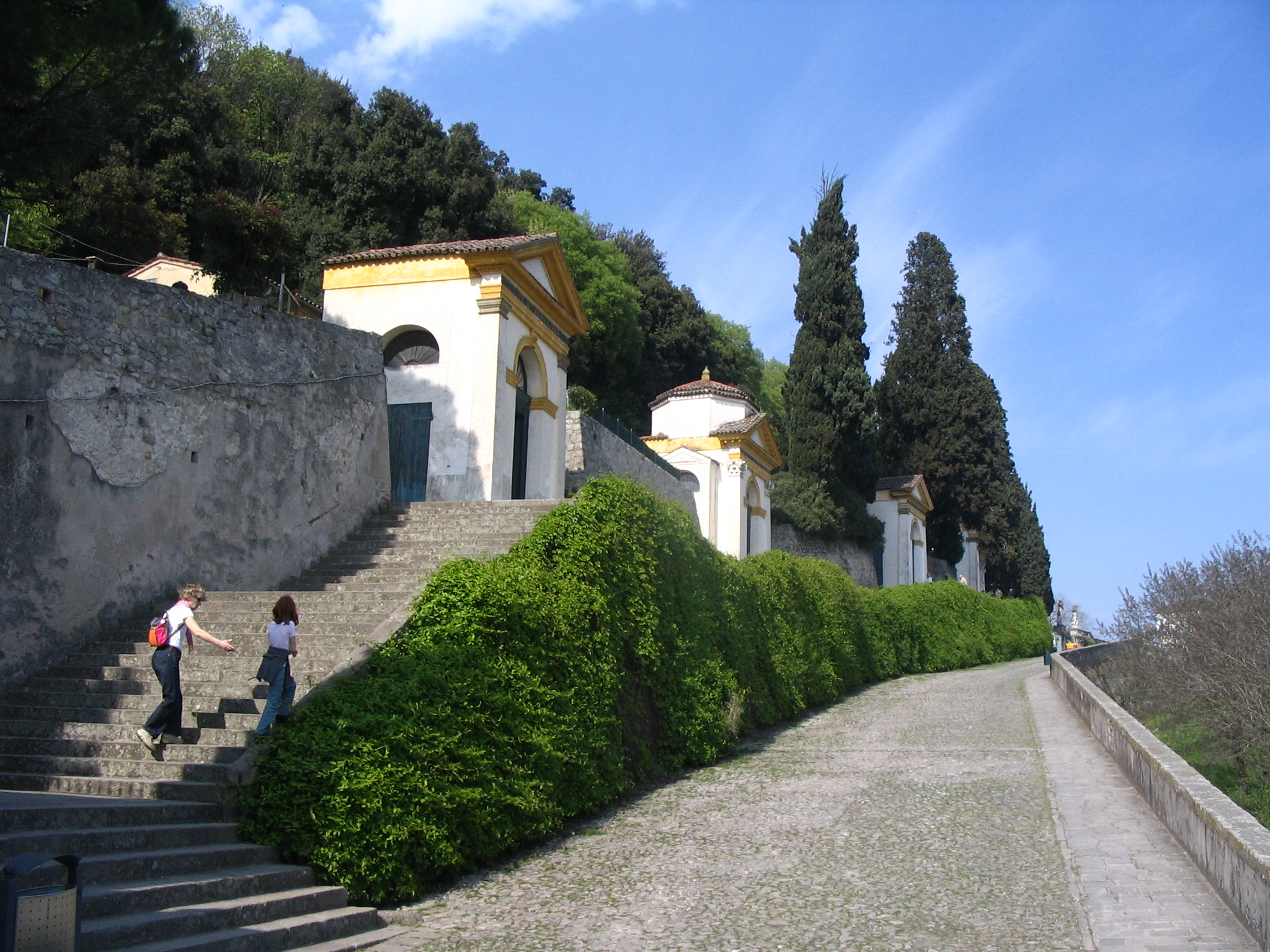
Sanctuary of the Seven Churches in Monselice

== Bibliography ==
- Babinger, Franz (1992). Mehmed the Conqueror & His Time. Princeton University Press.
- Bettinelli, G (1870). Dizionario storico-portatile di tutte le venete patrizie famiglie.
- Doumerc, Bernard (1987). Les Vénitiens à La Tana (Azov) au XVe siècle. Cahiers du monde russe et soviétique, Issue 28, 1987.
- Doumerc, Bernard; Stockly, Doris (1995). "L'évolution Du Capitalisme Marchand a Venise: Le Financement Des Galere Da Mercato à La Fin Du XVe Siècle". Annales. Histoire, Sciences Sociales (in French). 50 (1). Cambridge University Press: 133–157 – via JSTOR.
- Freschot, Casimir (1709). Nouvelle relation de la Ville et République de Venise. Guillaume van Poolsum.
- Gullino, Giuseppe (1996). "Le frontiere navali". Enciclopedia Treccani.
- Howorth, Henry Hoyle (1876). History of the Mongols: from the 9th to the 19th century. The University of California.
- Lockhart, Laurence; Morozzo della Rocca, Raimondo; Tiepolo, Maria Francesca (1973). I Viaggi in Persia degli ambasciatori veneti Barbaro e Contarini. Istituto poligrafico dello Stato, Libreria.
- Schefer, Charles Henri Auguste (1899). Revue de l'Orient latin, Volume 7. E. Lerou.
- Franz Schröder, Repertorio genealogico delle famiglie confermate nobili e dei titolati nobili esistenti nelle provincie Venete, tipografia Alvisopoli, Venezia, 1830.
- Saggio sulla Storia civile, politica, ecclesiastica e sulla corografia e yopografia degli Stati della Repubblica di Venezia ad uso della nobile e civile gioventù, Ab. D. Cristoforo Tentori Spagnuolo, Venezia, Ed. Giacomo Storti, 1785.*Società geograf ica italiana (1882). Studi biografici e bibliografici sulla storia della geografia in Italia'. Società geografica italiana.
- Storz, Otto-Hermann (2009). Die persische Karte : venezianisch-persische Beziehungen um 1500; Reiseberichte venezianischer Persienreisender. ISBN 978-3-643-10073-3.
