= Boccole =

Boccole or dalle Boccole was a noble family of the Republic of Venice, active in the 14th century.

Coat of arms of the house of Boccole

== History ==
The activity of the two brothers Marino and Pietro shows the prospering of the family in the second quarter of the 14th century.

== Members ==
- Marino Boccole (fl. 1348)
- Pietro Boccole (fl. 1348)
- Franceschino Boccole (fl. 13XX)
- Nicolò Boccole (fl. 1383), died without heirs.
- Giovanni Boccole (fl. 1384–95).
- Antonio Boccole (fl. 1403–22), conte ("count", governor) of Cattaro (Kotor) in 1420–22. His 1403 will has survived. He had two sons.

== Sources ==
- Manuale del Regno di Dalmazia. G. Wodtzka. 1875.
- Romano, Dennis (1987). Patricians and popolani: the social foundations of the Venetian Renaissance state. Johns Hopkins University Press. pp. 47–. ISBN 9780801835131.
