= Zonta =

Zonta can refer to:

== Surname ==
- María Zonta (born 1989), Argentine volleyball player
- Peter Žonta (born 1979), Slovenian ski jumper
- Ricardo Zonta (born 1976), Brazilian racing driver

== Other uses ==
- Zonta (Republic of Venice), extraordinary adjunct members to the Venetian governing councils
- Zonta International, service organization
- Giunti (printers), Florentine family of printers, also spelled Zonta
