= Muda (convoy) =

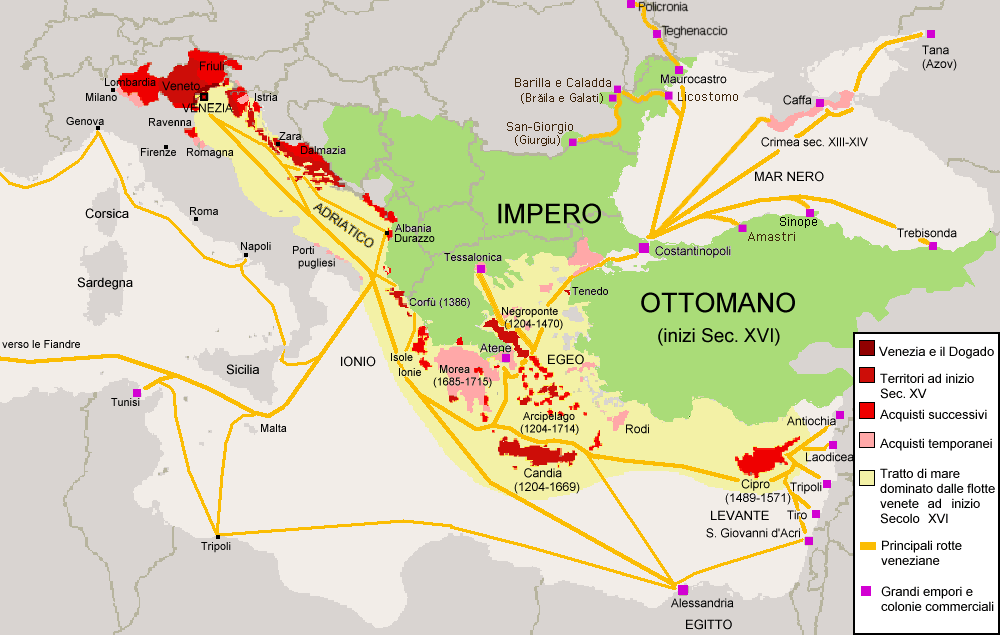
The commercial network and territories of the Republic of Venice. Venetian possessions are marked in red.

Muda were the commercial expeditions of the Republic of Venice, conducted annually by naval convoys that were organized by the state and subcontracted to private merchant companies. The ships usually left Venice in spring and came back in autumn. The mude system operated continuously between 1315 and 1533. In the earliest times, the mudas only visited ports in the Levant. In later years, the ships also sailed to European ports. Along with merchants and goods, the mudas brought knowledge, new ideas and new cultures to Venice.

The Muda were distinguished from completely private merchant enterprises by the fact that they were made up of galea grossa da merchado (great merchant galleys) and were led by a commander, the Captain, appointed by the Venetian Senate, whose interests he officially represented in the destination markets. The mude took their names from the main regions in which they operated (Muda of Syria, Muda of Egypt, etc.) and the term itself (muda) was inspired by their periodicity (arrivals and departures occurred at certain times of the year), similar to that of migratory birds.

== History ==
=== The origins ===
From the birth of Venice until the early 13th century, Venetian commercial power was managed exclusively by private individuals, among whom the Venetian patriciate stood out, which, in addition to trade, was also dedicated to the management of public affairs. With the evolution of nautical and commercial knowledge, members of the patriciate during the 11th century formed the first mercantile societies, initially composed of members of the same family, which is why they were also called unions of brothers. These were companies made up of a variable number of members in which the capital was divided equally and where the participants' profits were proportional to the profit generated by the financed expedition.

To face the ever-increasing Genoese competition, in 1238 the State decided to intervene directly in the commercial relations between merchants heading to Alexandria by requiring them to set up a company dedicated to the export of pepper and cotton. This first state intervention was followed by others over the course of the century; in 1290, for the first time, the state financed the construction of ten merchant galleys bound for the Byzantine Empire. Following the first direct management of a galley in 1294, the State began to propose a new type of contract to the Venetian patricians, the maona. Developed in the Republic of Genoa, the maona was a financial company with private administration under the guarantee of the State that undertook to offer the vessels to private individuals. The gestion of maonas was subject to progressive improvements and changes, which by the 14th century would form the muda system.

=== The end of the system ===
The system entered into crisis at the end of the 15th century, with the voyages of Vasco de Gama who, opening the way to the circumnavigation of the African continent, allowed the Portuguese to intercept precious Asian products upstream, directly in India and South Arabia, progressively drying up the Egyptian and Syrian markets. At the same time, the disappearance of the Byzantium and the appearance on the scene of the aggressive Ottoman Empire posed a serious threat to the survival of the Venetian colonies in the East. In an attempt to support the centuries-old system, the Senate began to guarantee adequate non-repayable funding that could reach several thousand ducats to encourage private participation, but the voyages of Columbus, the discovery of the Americas and the opening of routes across the Atlantic which brought new and even more exotic products back to Europe, in addition to immensely enriching Venice's new commercial rivals, Spain and Portugal first and foremost, forced the suspension of public-initiated voyages in the 1520s.

== Institutions ==
=== The Savi agli Ordini ===
The organization of the mude was entrusted to the five Savi agli Ordini who had the task of drawing up the regulations for the journey of each muda, taking into account the rules promulgated in 1255 by the doge Renier Zen and modified up to 1343. The election of the five Savi agli Ordini was established by the Major Council with a decree dated 8 March 1321 and the five savi took this name since the rules of the navigation of the convoys were precisely defined as orders. The Savi agli Ordini were aggregated to the Senate in 1442. The Senate elected two or three savi every six months alternately, who unlike the other members of the College of the Savi did not necessarily have to be members of the Senate.

== Muda system ==
=== Organization ===
The muda were organized by the Republic, usually on an annual basis. The government provided its own ships (usually between 2 and 5 galleys per voyage) and subcontracted them to private merchant companies through a public auction (incanto). The auction was convened and regulated by the Senate, which at the same time approved the regulations that the contractors would have to respect during the voyage. Most of these rules were discussed directly with the private individuals, such as the departure date, the duration of the stops, the route to follow, the crew to hire, the type and quantity of goods to be loaded, and the number of galleys suitable for the voyage. Once the bids were approved, the private individuals leading the consortia were appointed "patrons" of the galleys and could enjoy all the benefits offered by the muda system. The muda offered for the two months following the departure the complete monopoly of the goods that had been agreed to be transported on that route and the freight (a tax of 2-3% on the transported goods) were halved.

The Senate appointed a Captain to command the entire convoy, accompanied by a scribe also publicly appointed, and an "Ammiraglio," who was responsible for navigation. The Captain was the representative of the State and was responsible for overseeing the application of the rules imposed by the Senate on all ships. Furthermore, as a public official, the Captain had the duty and honor of gathering and recording all information he learned during the voyage, and reporting them to the Senate upon his return to Venice.

Each patron was required personally participate inn the voyage and rent the space in his galley to various merchants in "carats." For logical and economic reasons, the privileged merchants were the same ones who had supported and financed the election of the patron himself. The merchants who loaded their own goods on board did not always accompany them but delegated the patrons to sell them in specific ports and at specific prices. Another important task of the patrons was to recruit the crew for their galley, such as oarsmen, crossbowmen, the ship's doctor, and officers (i.e., the "homo de conzeio," the navigator, and the "Paron zurado," the deck officer), and pay their salaries. In the Muda of Flanders in 1468, the galley's "patron" Giovanni Foscari writes at the beginning of his travel book:

Nel nome del Signore Iddio, della Madonna santa Maria, dell'evangelista san Marco nostro protettore e di tutta la corte celeste, io Giovanni Foscari figlio di Marco e patron di una delle galee presenti al viaggio di Fiandra, capitano Luca Moro, da qui in avanti annoterò su questo libro tutte le faccende che ho da sbrigare, sia quelle di mia competenza che quelle altrui e prego il Signore Iddio affinché mi doni un buon viaggio e la salvezza dello spirito.

— Giovanni Foscari, Viaggio di Fiandra, In the name of Lord God and of Our Lady Holy Mary and of our protector, the vassal, Lord Saint Mark, and of the entire choir of the Zellestials, I, Zuane Foschari, son of Lord Marcho, and owner of one of the present galleys on the voyage to Flanders, captain of Lord Lucha Moro, will do all the work, both with my own expertise and with the reason of others, on this book given here before you, and I pray Lord God to grant me a good journey and safety.

=== The function ===
Similarly to the fondachi and the merchant associations, the muda were conceived to make the Venetian commercial system more efficient and profitable.

The Mude system functioned through two closed circles, one for the East and the other for the West, centered on the Rialto market, where supply and demand met and prices were set:

- Venice collected raw materials (silver from Alpine and German mines and timber) from the hinterland and, together with weapons and finished fabrics produced in the city, sent them to the Eastern Mediterranean;
- here, in the Middle East, Venetian merchants exchanged these goods for the precious spices, incense, perfumes, silks and cotton, all coming from Asia via the Silk Road, the Incense Road, and the sea routes in the Indian Ocean, controlled by the Byzantines and the Arabs: the products purchased in the Levantine markets were then loaded onto galleys and brought home;
- once they arrived in Venice, the precious exotic goods were sent to Western markets by land or by sea;
- the muda sent to the West, in particular, mainly transported spices and cotton to the English markets and to Flanders, where they were exchanged for raw fabrics such as English woollen cloth and Flemish fabrics, to be brought back to Venice to be finished: in addition to this, the voyages in the Western Mediterranean served to exchange the cloth mainly for gold coming from the African hinterland, material necessary to mint the Venetian ducat.

== Western Muda ==
=== Muda of Flanders ===
Outward voyage of the Flanders Muda that set sail from Venice on 13 July 1463

Return voyage of the Muda of Flanders which landed in Venice on 15 November 1464

The Flanders muda was created to increase and stabilize the trade relations between Venice and the port cities of the Kingdom of England and County of Flanders. Once setting sail from Venice, the muda called at some of the major port cities on the Adriatic and in Sicily before continuing towards the Iberian Peninsula, stopping in Palma de Mallorca and then stopping in Cádiz, one of the major port cities of Kingdom of Castile and León. From Cádiz, the convoy headed towards Lisbon, the capital of the Kingdom of Portugal, and from there sailed to the ports of the Kingdom of Galicia, from where the ships would then sail to reach English ports. Once through the Bay of Biscay, the ships made long stops in Southampton and London, in the England, and in Bruges, in the County of Flanders. On the return journey, the ships quickly reached Cádiz in the numerous Muslim ports between Almeria, in the Sultanate of Granada and Tunis, among the dominions of the Hafsid dynasty. Once setting sail from Tunis, the convoy headed towards Sicily and from there towards Venice. The muda was established in 1315 and lasted until 1533.

=== Muda of Aigue-Mortes ===
Muda of Aigues-Mortes in 1424

The Aigues-Mortes muda was created to increase and stabilize the commercial relations between Venice and the port cities of Medieval France and the Crown of Aragon. After landing in the major cities of the Tyrrhenian coast such as Messina, Palermo, Naples and Pisa, the muda proceeded from the Gulf of Lion making stops in the cities between Port-de-Bouc (near Marseille) and Agde, passing through Aigues-Mortes, near Montpellier. Sometimes the muda continued towards the major cities of the Crown of Aragon, landing in succession at Barcelona, Tortosa and Valencia. It was stabilized in 1412 and then decommissioned in 1494, after 82 years of activity The establishment of the Aigues-Mortes muda was gradual. In July 1401, the Flanders muda left Venice for the ports of London and Bruges with a convoy of six ships, instead of the usual five. On the return journey, the additional ship separated from the convoy to reach the port of Montpellier on its own on May 15, 1402, where it would stop for eight days. The ship's captain, Lorenzo Contarini, once he had landed and obtained the necessary documents, proceeded with the transhipment of a cargo of spices worth 100,000 florins. The success of the expedition convinced the Senate to repeat the operation the following year, and the stopover was extended to fifteen days. After a few years of interruption, in 1412 the Senate established by decree the muda of Aigues-Mortes; composed of a single galley which would leave Venice at the beginning of spring and then sail along the coast of Italy and head near Montpellier towards the port of Aigues-Mortes where it would stop for eighteen days.

=== Muda of Barberia ===
Muda of Barberia in 1458.

The Barberia muda was created to increase and stabilize the commercial relations between Venice and the port cities of the Barbary Coast, the Sultanate of Granada, and the Crown of Aragon. Departing from Venice, the muda headed towards the ports of Aragonese Sicily and, after stopping in Syracuse, it set sail towards Tripoli, Djerba, and Tunis, the major centers of the dominions of the Hafsid dynasty. From Tunis it then landed in the ports of the Kingdom of Tlemcen making stops at Béjaïa, Algiers and Oran, then from there it left for Málaga in the Sultanate of Granada and then sailed along the coast of Spain up to Valencia and Tortosa. Established on 10 December 1436, it was decommissioned in 1533, remaining operational for almost a century.

=== Muda of Trafego ===
It was established in 1460 and was directed to Tunis and, sailing along the coast of Africa up to Alexandria in Egypt, it arrived at Beirut and Modone.

== Muda of Levante ==
=== Muda of Siria ===
It sailed to Cyprus, Beirut and Laiazzo and operated almost exclusively for the cotton trade.

=== Muda of Egypt ===
Originating in the 12th century, it set sail twice a year along with the Rum Muda, following the "Via Egnatia." Departing from Venice, the Muda sailed along the coast of Dalmatia and then split up at Modon in the Peloponnese, from there they headed towards Crete and Cyprus before stopping in the Levant, particularly in the cities of Beirut, Tyre and Acre. Once they had stopped in the Levant, the Muda (or part of it) continued towards the Fatimid Caliphate in the Egyptian cities of Damietta and Alexandria.

=== Muda of Rum and the Black Sea ===
Originating together with the Egyptian muda, it split from it at Modon, in the Peloponnese, from there it then skirted the Greek coasts, stopping at the cities of Athens, Chalcis (on the island of Euboea) and Thessalonica, from there it then headed towards Abydos on the Dardanelles Strait before reaching its destination in Constantinople. In 1318 the muda was institutionalized and was subsequently extended towards the Black Sea, where until 1450 it stopped at Tana and Trebizond.

== Sources ==
- Caravale, Mario (1997). "History of Venice: Le istituzioni della Repubblica". Rome: Istituto dell'Enciclopedia Italiana.
- Dal Borgo, Michela (2016). Non solo spezie (PDF) (in Italian). Lineadacqua edizioni. ISBN 978-88-9559-861-1.
- Doumerc, Bernard (1996). "Il dominio del mare". In Alberto Tenenti; Ugo Tucci (eds.). Storia di Venezia. Dalle origini alla caduta della Serenissima. Vol. IV: Il Rinascimento. Politica e cultura (in Italian). Rome: Enciclopedia Italiana. pp. 113–180. OCLC 644711024.
- Hocquet, Jean=Claude (1997). "History of Venice: I meccanismi dei traffici". Rome: Istituto dell'Enciclopedia Italiana.
- Montemezzo, Stefania (2012). Giovanni Foscari. Viaggi di Fiandra 1463-1464 e 1467-68 (PDF) (in Italian). La Malcontenta edizioni. ISBN 978-88-95745-26-8.
- Rösch, Gerhard (1992). "History of Venice: Mercatura e moneta". Rome: Istituto dell'Enciclopedia Italiana.
