= Attack on Tulemajärvi =

Swedish attack in 1657

- Part of the Russo-Swedish War (1656–1658)
Date	29 March 1657
Location	Tulemajärvi, Lake Ladoga
Result	Swedish victory
Territorial changes	Tulemajärvi is razed

Belligerents
(yes) Swedish Empire	Tsardom of Russia

Commanders and leaders
(Swedish Empire) Gustav Evertsson Horn (Swedish Empire) Erik Pistolhielm	Unknown

Units involved
Unknown	Unknown

Strength
300 cavalry	Unknown

Casualties and losses
Unknown	Everyone killed

The attack on Tulemajärvi occurred in 1657 as part of the Russo-Swedish War of 1656–1658. A Swedish force of 300 cavalry, under Erik Pistolhielm, successfully attacked the town, killing all of its inhabitants and razing it.

== Background ==
After the death of a certain Lejonhufvud, Charles X Gustav, upon receiving the news, appointed Gustav Evertsson Horn as governor-general of Finland, and Christer Horn to the same in Ingria and Kexholm county. Erik Kruse, who had led an earlier expedition to Olonets, was thanked in writing for his bravery and dexterity he had shown in the aforementioned expedition.

On the battlefield, there had been a relative peace, with the exception of some minor raids that the Russians had committed against Nöteborg.

After arriving in February, Horn harbored no moral scruples in terms of "terrorist warfare". After reconnaissance, he assembled a force in northern Kexholm county of some 300 cavalry to destroy the village of Tulemajärvi. Horn intended to ravage a large area in order to make a possible Russian attack on Savolax more difficult.

Portrait of Gustav Evertsson Horn by David Klöcker Ehrenstrahl

== Attack ==
On 29 March, Horn advanced into Russia through northern Kexholm County. Taking advantage of the Orthodox Easter, the Swedish force under Erik Pistolhielm made a surprise attack on Tulemajärvi, killing all of its inhabitants, who had, unaware of the danger, had, as was their custom, given themselves up to eating and drinking. and razing the village, along with the inhabitants to were in their houses.

The Swedes also destroyed several Russian supply depots and ravaged the countryside as they marched through it. Along with this, a neighbouring village was also destroyed by the Swedes.

After they had razed Tulemajärvi, the Swedes marched another mile and a half into Russia, burning and killing everything and everyone they encountered.

== Aftermath ==
The attack on Tulemajärvi became the last notable military event on the Finnish border for the rest of 1657.

== Works cited ==
- Essen, Michael Fredholm von (2022). Charles X's Wars Vol.2: The Wars in the East, 1655-1657. Helion & Company. ISBN 9781915070302.
- Ignatius, Karl Emil Ferdinand (1865). Finlands historia under Karl X Gustafs regering [History of Finland during the reign of Karl X Gustaf] (in Swedish). Edlund.
- Lappalainen, Jussi T. (1979). Stade, Arne (ed.). Kriget på östfronten [The War on the Eastern Front] (in Swedish). Militärhistoriska förlaget. ISBN 9789185266098.
- Lappalainen, Jussi T. (1972). Kaarle X Kustaan Venäjän-sota v. 1656-1658 Suomen suunnalla (in Finnish). University of Jyväskylä. ISBN 9789516770263.
