= Johann Gustav Stockenberg =

Swedish sculptor who lived and worked in Estonia

- Gustav Jansson Stockenberg
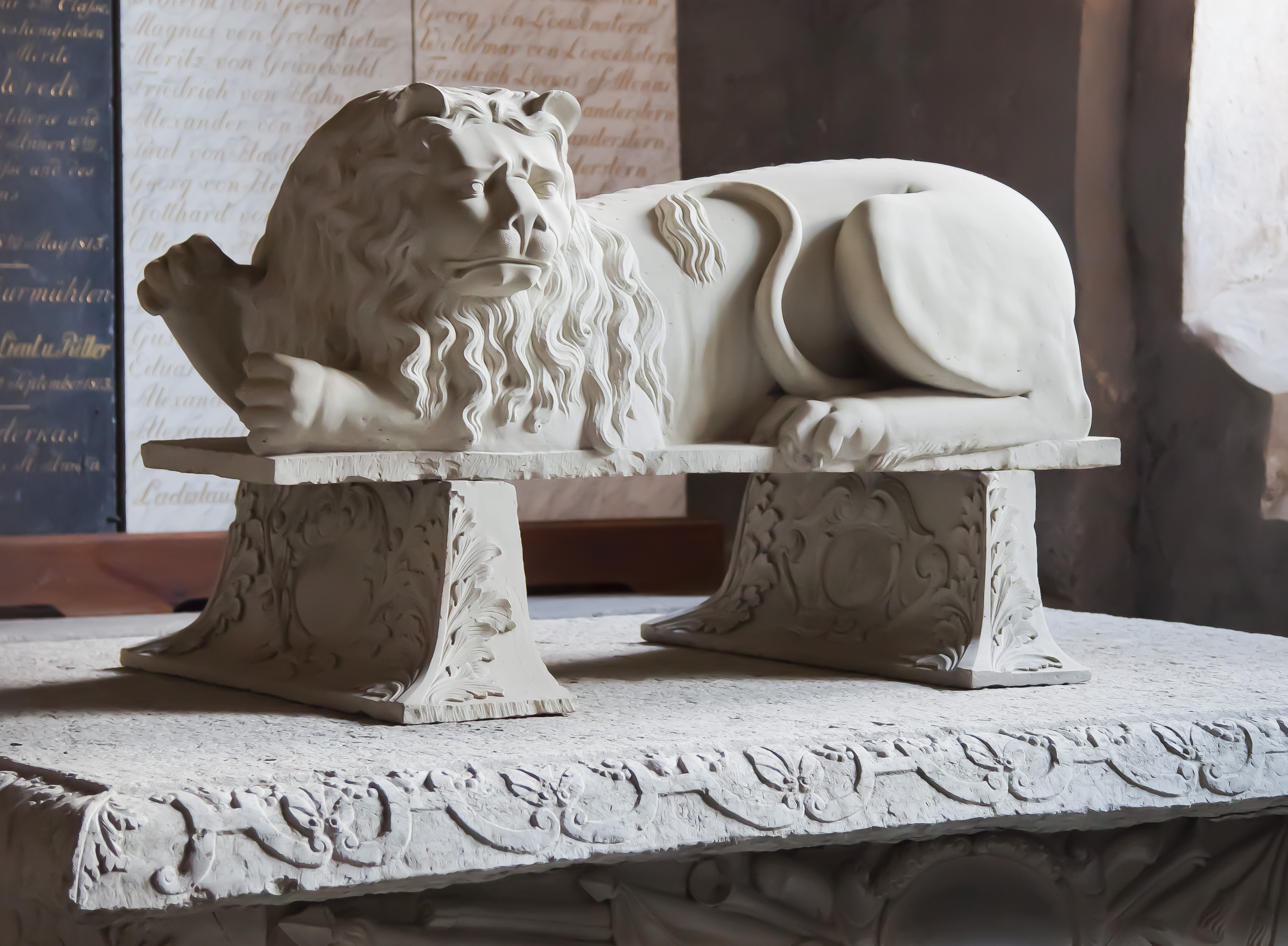
- Detail view of Otto Wilhelm von Fersen's sarcophagus, likely created by Stockenberg
- Born: before c. 1660; Sweden
- Died: c. 1710; Tallinn, Estonia
- Known for: Sculpture
- Notable work: several stone sarcophagi in Saint Mary's Cathedral, Tallinn
- Style: Baroque sculpture
- Spouse: Magdalena Lamoureux

Johan(n) Gustav Stockenberg (c. 1660 – c. 1710, Tallinn) was a Swedish sculptor, wood carver and stonemason who worked in Sweden, Russia and mainly in Reval (now Tallinn, Estonia).

== Life and work ==
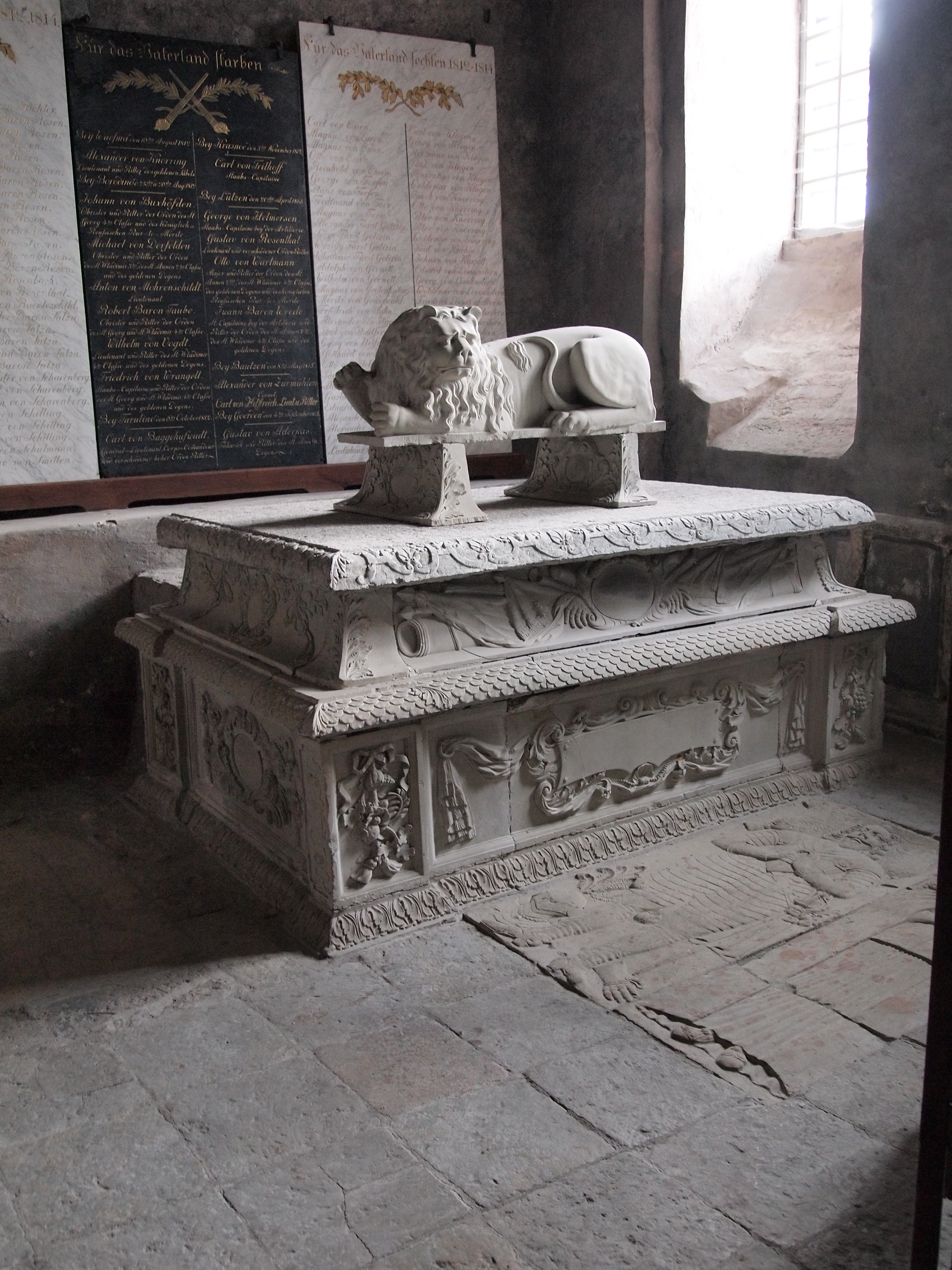
Sarcophagus of Otto Wilhelm von Fersen in Saint Mary's Cathedral, Tallinn, likely crafted by Stockenberg at the beginning of the 18th century

Stockenberg was born in Sweden (probably in Stockholm) and came to Reval (Tallinn) from Copenhagen (Denmark), where he had moved with his brother in law Abraham-César Lamoureux in 1681.

He lived on St. Anthony's Hill in Reval and took part in the reconstruction of Saint Mary's Cathedral after it had been severely damaged by fire in 1684. From 1687 he was employed to work on conversions and improvements to Toompea Castle. In August 1705 he was referred to as ″Königl. Fortifications Bild und Steinhauer″ (royal fortification's sculptor and stonemason).

In 1688, he constructed the windows, doors and stairs for Maardu Manor, which brought him into conflict with the guild of masons and sculptors as he was not a member of the guild.

His best known works are several stone sarcophagi that were commissioned for prominent people buried in Saint Mary's Cathedral, notably the grave monuments for Otto Reinhold Taube, as well as the Swedish Field Marshals Fabian von Fersen (crafted by Stockenberg at the end of the 17th century) and Otto Wilhelm von Fersen.

Stockenberg died in Reval.

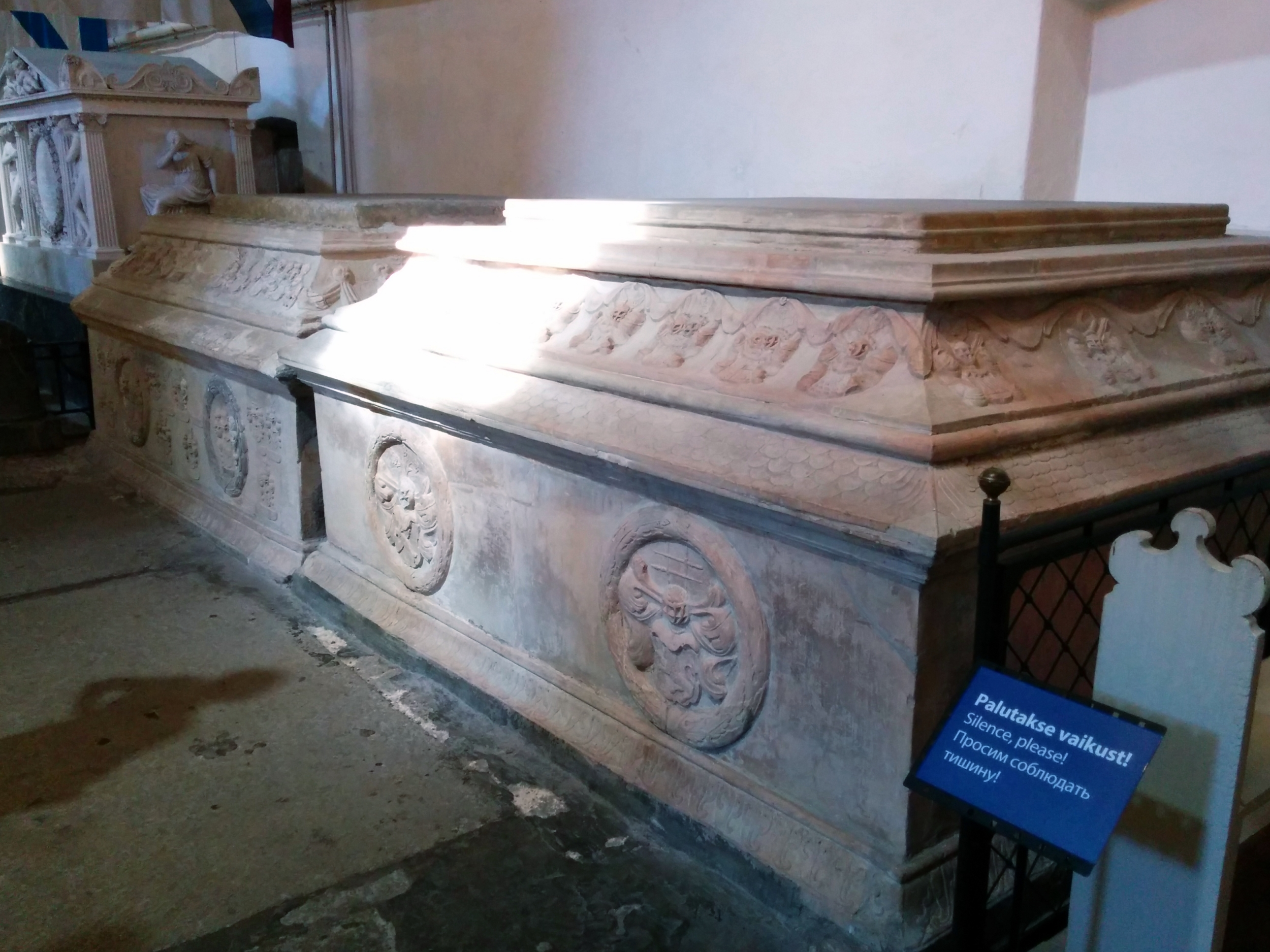
Sarcophagus for Fabian von Fersen

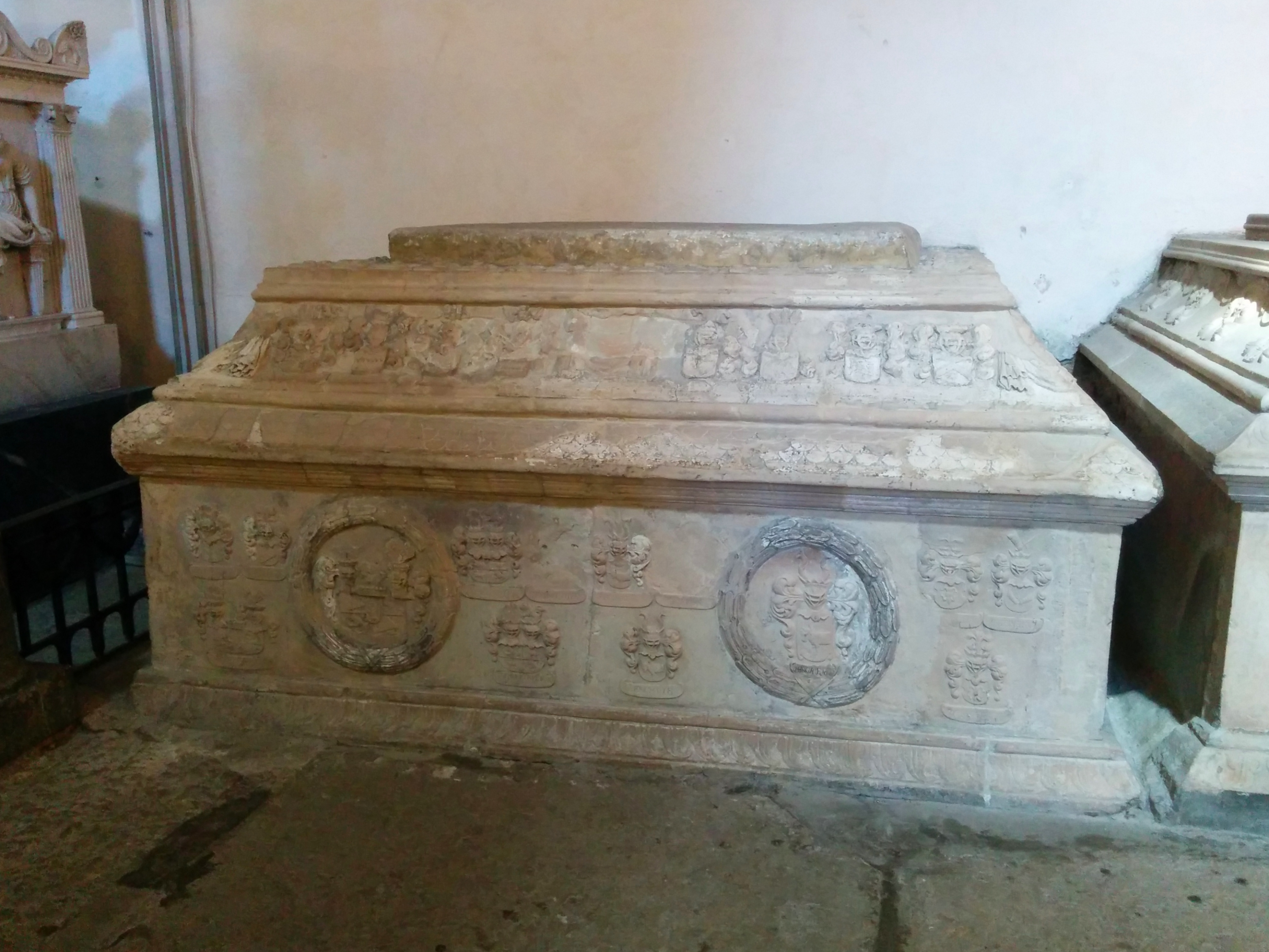
Sarcophagus for Otto Reinhold von Taube

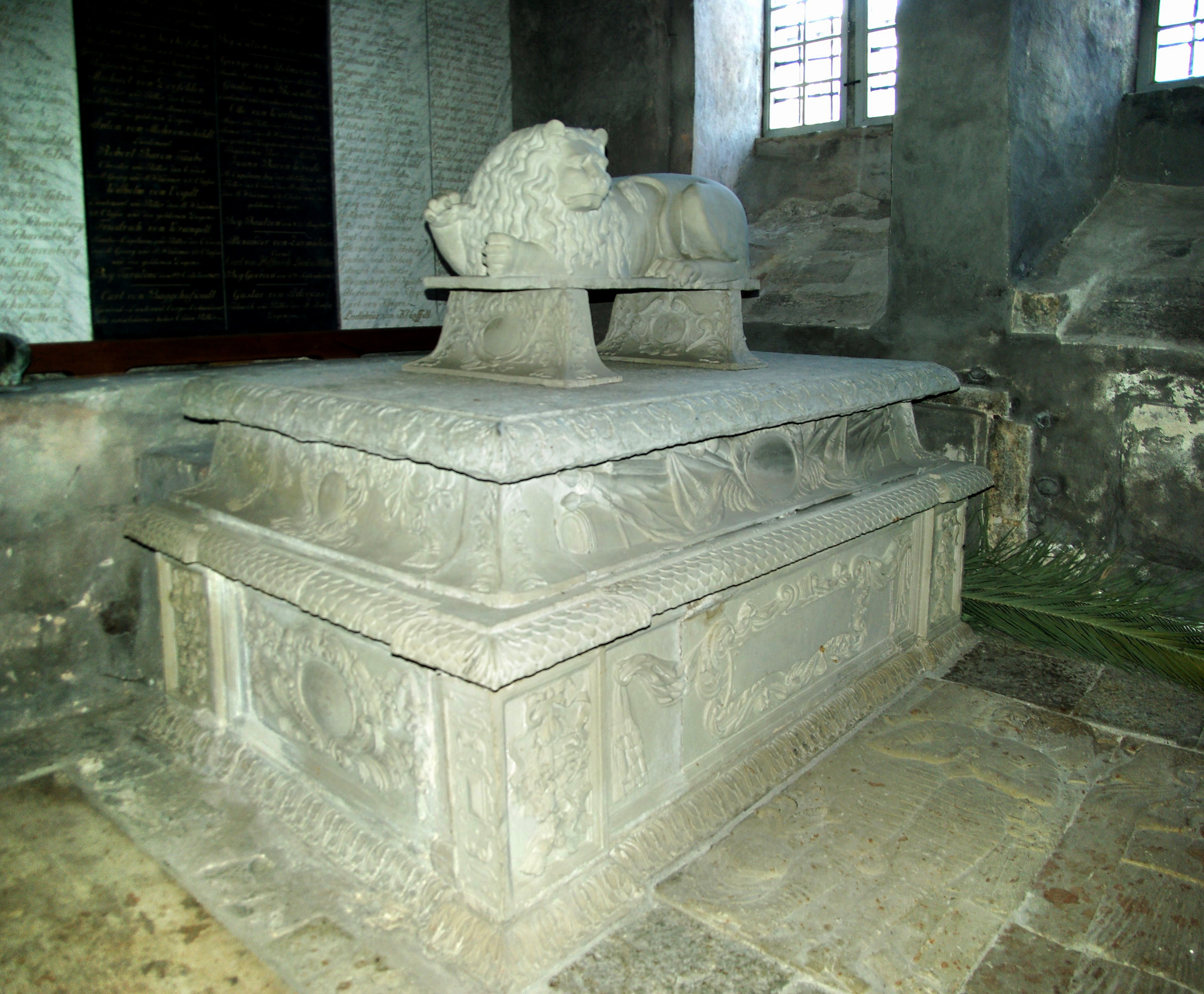
Sarcophagus for Otto Wilhelm von Fersen

== Literature ==
- Karling, S.I. (1943), Holzschnitzerei und Tischlerkunst der Renaissance und des Barocks in Estland, Commentationes Litterarum Societatis Esthonicae, vol. 34, Tartu: Õpetatud Eesti Selts, hdl:10062/20782
- Karling, S.I. (1936), Narva: Eine Baugeschichtliche Untersuchung, Kungl. Vitterhets- historie- och antikvitets akademien. Archäologische Monographien, vol. 25, Stockholm: Wahlström & Widstrand
- Antikvariska studier III, Kungl. Vitterhets, historie och antikvitets akademiens handlingar, Stockholm: Wahlström & Widstrand, 1948
