= Battle of Lava =

Russo-Swedish battle

- Part of the Russo-Swedish War (1656–1658)
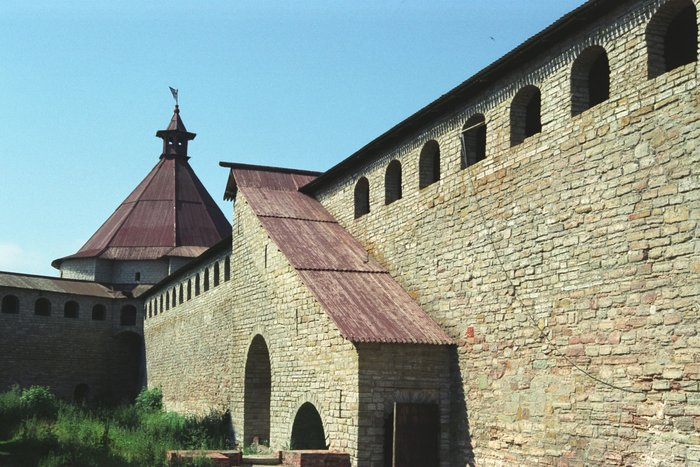
- Oreshek forts near Lava
Date	11 August 1657
Location	Lava ostrog, near Nöteborg, Swedish Empire (present-day Russia)
Result	Disputed, see result

Belligerents
(yes) Swedish Empire	Tsardom of Russia

Commanders and leaders
(Swedish Empire) Gustav Evertsson Horn (Swedish Empire) Bernhard von Vietinghoff (Swedish Empire) Johan Bäck (Swedish Empire) Berendt Gröön (Swedish Empire) Arvid Gyldenär	(Tsardom of Russia) Alexandr Potyomkin

Units involved
(Swedish Empire) Viborg cavalry Regiment (Swedish Empire) Vietinghoff's dragoons	(Tsardom of Russia) Lava regiment

Strength
1,700 men	1,300 men 2 guns

Casualties and losses
5 killed	13 killed One standard captured

The Battle of Lava (Swedish: Striden vid Lava; Russian: Битва за лаву) occurred on 11 August 1657, when a Swedish force, under the command of Gustav Evertsson Horn, attacked a Russian ostrog at Lava. Horn, who had not been notified that Carl Gustaf Wrangel would not be able to support him, was not able to dislodge the Russians.

== Background ==
In 1657, during the Russo-Swedish War of 1656–1658, the Swedish commander Gustav Evertsson Horn decided to capture the Russian redoubt at Lava to raise morale. To do this, he planned a two-pronged attack from land and sea. Carl Gustaf Wrangel, who was the commander of the Swedish fleet in the Gulf of Bothnia, would cross a nearby lake with the entire fleet, consisting of around 30 smaller vessels. He would land at the rear of Lava where he would cut communications between Ladoga and Lava. Meanwhile, Horn would march instead go by land and assault Lava. He had seven companies from the Viborg Cavalry Regiment, five companies from Christopher Burmeister's Cavalry Regiment, both companies of the retinue of nobles of Finland, consisting of some 200 infantry, and 400 dragoons from multiple regiments under Lieutenant Colonel Bernhard von Vietinghoff. In total, Horn had some 1,700 men at his disposal.

=== Prelude ===
In early August, Horn arrived at Lava late at night. When the Russians didn't respond, he dug into a hill behind a clearing. Simultaneously, Wrangel enacted his part of the attack. On the same day as Horn's arrival at Lava, Wrangel encountered a squadron of Russian vessels off the coast of Lava. A two-hour-long battle ensued, and based from Russian accounts, Wrangel's squadron would disengage and continued further eastwards, pursued by Russian units on the shore.

On the following day, Wrangel returned, trying a landing at Kobona. However, nearby Russian units, shallow water, and the lack of suitable harbours prevented the landing. Wrangel would go back to Shlisselburg, only managing to divide Potyomkin's forces, which helped Horn, but he had nonetheless failed to carry out his share of the plan.

== Battle ==
On 11 August, on the day of Wrangels attempted landing at Kobona, Horn began the attack on Lava. Horn sent out 15 scouts on horseback to do reconnaissance. When they rode up to the walls of the Lava redoubt, the leader of the scouts fired his pistol at the redoubt after not seeing any Russians, suddenly the gate opened with the Russians quickly emerging, forcing the Swedes to retreat. Despite his silence, Potyomkin knew of the attack. He now marched his entire force out, consisting of some two companies of cavalry, 425 Don and other Cossacks, 300 streltsy, two Dragoon companies, and one infantry company, in total some 1,300 men along with two cannons.

Horn had entrenched himself on the hill with 200 infantry, Vietinghoff's dragoons, the regimental guns, and the two companies from the retinue of nobles, likely making up the reserve. Despite the nearby forest, he positioned the remaining cavalry in the traditional wings. In front of the hill, Horn deployed a vanguard of 208 men from the Viborg cavalry Regiment under Major Johan Bäck. Bäck had 107 cavalry in a second line of the guard, while he deployed the remaining 100 cavalrymen in the front, commanded by the captains Berendt Gröön and Arvid Gyldenär. Last, Horn placed a cavalry unit with 50 men under Lieutenant Berg in between the advance guard and the hill. Horn's plan might have been for Bäck to delay the Russians as they charged, allowing the two cavalry wings to execute a flank manoeuver across the open ground in the clearing.

Less is known about Potyomkin's deployment than Horn. However, it is clear that Potyomkin sent forward an advance guard of cavalry. Upon seeing Gröön and Gyldenär's units in the clearing, the Russian vanguard stopped while in the forest, awaiting reinforcements. After this, Gröön and Gyldenär charged the Russians, forcing them to retreat in slight disorder, taking cover behind their infantry. Gröön managed to captured a Russian standard. However, the combat along with the dense cover caused disorder in the Swedish troops as well. They retreated back into the clearing to re-organize their lines.

Then, Major Bäck, who was meant to cover the Swedish retreat, opened fire on them instead, after which he turned his cavalry around and fled from the clearing. In the ensuing chaos, his own cavalry as well those under Lieutenant Berg followed him. While the cavalrymen took cover among the infantry stationed on the hill, Bäck rejoined his own troops, the retinue of nobles, where he fired two cannons and allegedly had a nervous breakdown. Potyomkin, taking advantage of the opportunity, sent his entire force against Gröön and Gyldenär. Being forced up the hill, there was little the Swedes could do, despite Gyldenär managing to prevent the Russians from retrieving their captured standard. Vietinghoff's dragoons were pushed back as well, being forced to abandon their positions. Horn led 200 infantry in a counterattack. At this point, some of the cavalry from Viborg and other dragoons rallied, joining Horn's attack. After half an hour of fighting, the Russians retreated. However, the retreat was in good order, not allowing the Swedes to go into action, and the Russians returned to the redoubt.

== Aftermath ==
The Swedish casualties were estimated to have been only 5 men, although it is possible that they were higher since the losses of other units were not known yet. Potyomkin reported losses of three officers and 10 soldiers. What happened to Bäck during the battle is debated. However, after the battle, Bäck's behaviour resulted in many complaints, leading to a court-martial. Bäck most likely suffered from what would today be known as PTSD (Post-traumatic stress disorder). Before the battle, Bäck requested to be released from duty. However, PTSD was not yet something the Swedish army regarded as a valid reason to be released from duty, possibly leading to Horn assigning Bäck the command of the advance guard, possibly thinking that responsibility would cure Bäck of his worries.

The court-martial of Bäck lasted for a considerable amount of time, however, several officers displayed a degree of understanding for Bäck, which led to the proceedings ending with a technical reprimand, being forced to apologize to Horn.

After the battle, Horn may have pondered on whether or not to continue his offensive. He was not yet aware that Wrangel had failed to land his troops, nor that Wrangel had returned to Nöteborg after his failed landing. However, already in the evening, Russian troops began burning crops in the area, and since Horn had been forced to rely on taking food from Russian territory, and this becoming impossible, he ordered a retreat.

== Result ==
The exact result of the battle is disputed. Some historians view the battle as inconclusive, while others view it as a Russian victory,

== Works cited ==
- Kurbatov, Oleg (2018). Русско-Шведская война 1656-1658 [Russo-Swedish War of 1656-1658] (in Russian). Moscow: Runivers.ru.
- Lappalainen, Jussi T. (1979). Stade, Arne (ed.). Kriget på östfronten [The War on the Eastern Front] (in Swedish). Militärhistoriska förlaget. pp. 134–137. ISBN 9789185266098.
- Essen, Michael Fredholm von (2023). Charles X's Wars: Volume 3 - The Danish Wars, 1657-1660. Helion & Company. pp. 228–231. ISBN 9781915113603.
- Sundberg, Ulf (2010). Sveriges krig 1630-1814 [Sweden's wars 1630–1814] (in Swedish). Svenskt militärhistoriskt bibliotek. p. 142. ISBN 9789185789634.
