= National Heritage Board =

National Heritage Board may refer to:

- National Heritage Board (Estonia), which maintains the National Register of Cultural Monuments
- National Heritage Board (Singapore)
- Swedish National Heritage Board

== See also ==
- National Institute of Cultural Heritage, Poland
