= Fabian von Fersen =

Swedish general

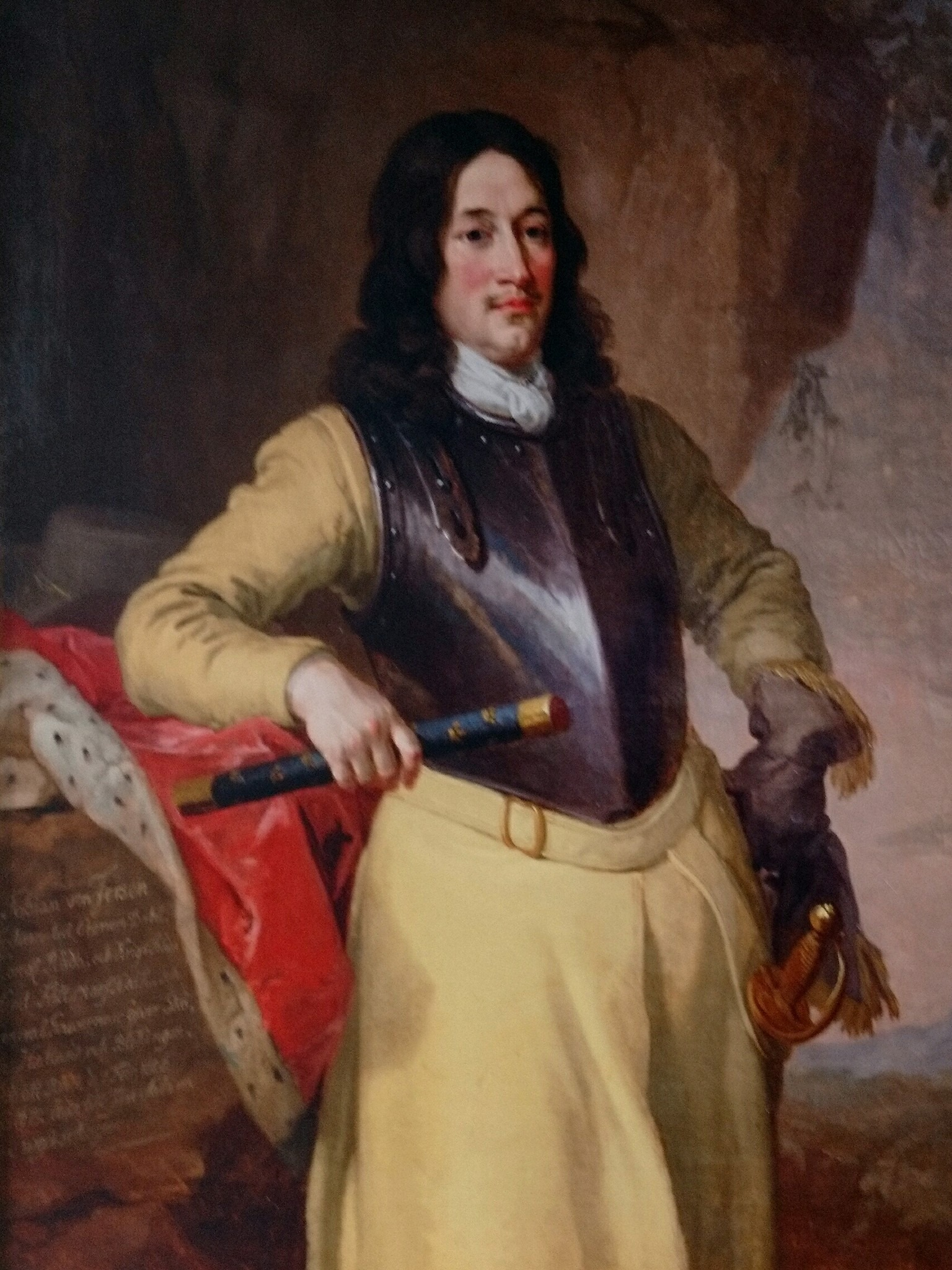
- Born: February 7, 1626; Tallinn, Swedish Estonia, Swedish Empire
- Died: June 30, 1677 (aged 51); Malmö, Scania, Swedish Empire
- Burial place: St Mary's Cathedral, Tallinn, Estonia
- Military career
- Allegiance: Swedish Empire
- Branch: Swedish Army
- Service years: 1675–1677
- Rank: Field Marshal
- Conflicts: Torstenson War Thirty Years' War; Deluge (history): Siege of Kraków (1657); Dano-Swedish War (1657–58): March Across the Belts; Dano-Swedish War (1658–1660): Battle of the Sound; Assault on Copenhagen (1659); Scanian War: Siege of Malmö

Baron Fabian von Fersen (February 7, 1626 – July 30, 1677) was a Swedish general, freelord, field-marshal and governor general of Scania, Halland and Blekinge. He served the Swedish Empire in multiple wars and received appointments Field Marshal, and then Governor General of the Scanian lands, which included the provinces of Skåne, Halland and Blekinge in 1676.

== Military career ==
Fabian von Fersen became a court cadet in 1643, participated as a volunteer in the navy in 1644 in Torstensson War and then in the Thirty Years' War, and became a lieutenant colonel in 1647.

Fersen was a cousin of Otto Wilhelm von Fersen and, like him, participated in Charles X Gustav's Polish wars and the wars against Denmark.

== Death ==
When the Danes stormed Malmö in 1677, Fersen managed to repel the attack with only 2,000 soldiers, but he suffered such severe injuries that he died a few days later. He was buried in St Mary's Cathedral, Reval (modern-day Tallinn), where a sarcophagus created by the sculptor Johann Gustav Stockenberg was erected in his memory.

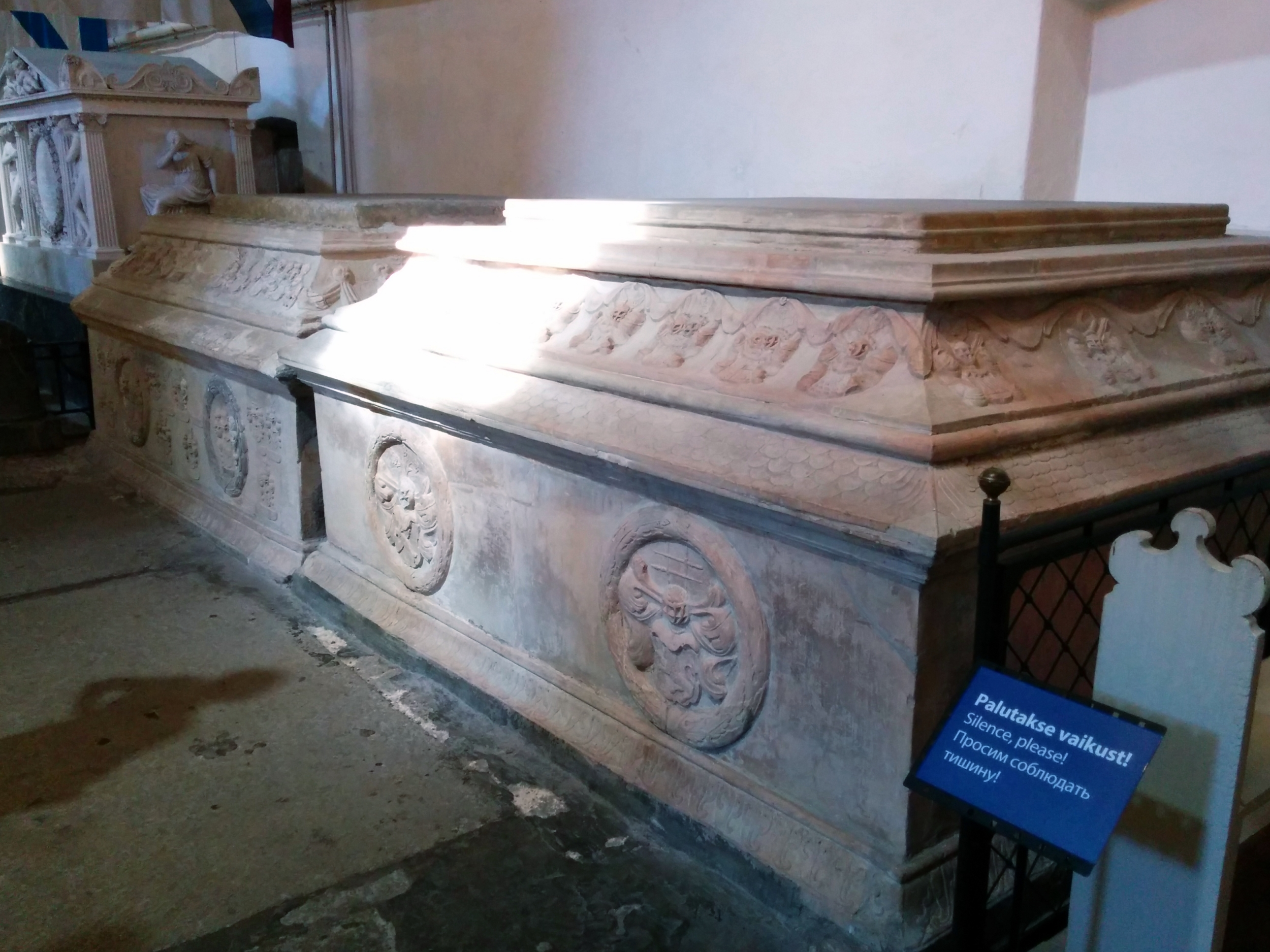
Sarcophagus of Fabian von Fersen in St Mary's Cathedral, Tallinn.
