= Nils Jonsson Stromberg af Clastorp =

Swedish noble (1646–1723)

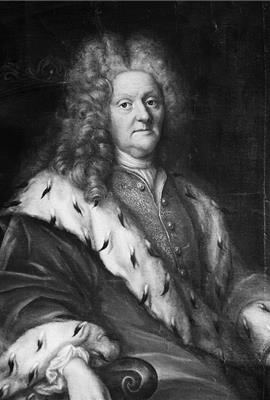
Portrait of Nils Stromberg by Georg Desmarées

Nils Jonsson Stromberg af Clastorp (March 25, 1646 – August 16, 1723) was a Swedish soldier and Governor-General of Swedish Estonia from 1706 to 1709.

He was born with the family name Brattman which was ennobled to Strömberg in 1674, and after receiving the title of baron (friherre) in 1699, wrote himself "Stromberg". In 1703, he was appointed lieutenant general and in 1706 became a count while in Estonia. He added the "af Clastorp" after the family mansion Clastorp in Södermanland (in present-day Katrineholm Municipality).

During 1710, he had to defend Riga for several months during the Great Northern War, until surrendering and being held captive for a few months. He returned to Stockholm in 1711, where he was appointed president of the Swedish National Judicial Board for Public Lands and Funds (Kammarkollegiet) and its sub-organisation, the Swedish Agency for Public Management (Statskontoret).

Preceded by Wolmar Anton von Schlippenbach	Governor General of Swedish Estonia; 1706–1709	Succeeded by Carl Gustaf von Nieroth
