= Johann Heinrich Wedekind =

German painter (1674–1736)

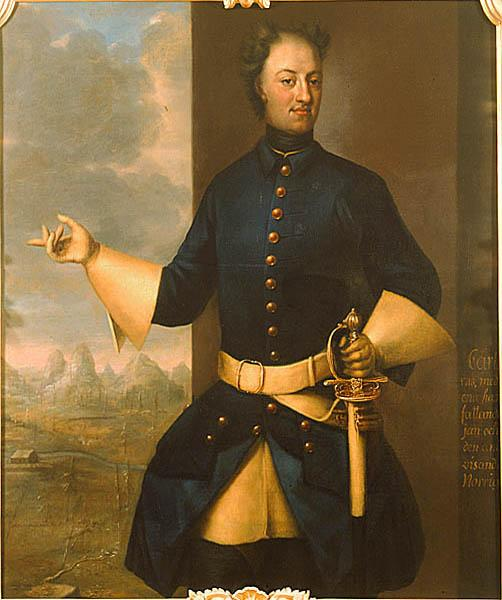
Charles XII of Sweden, c. 1715–19

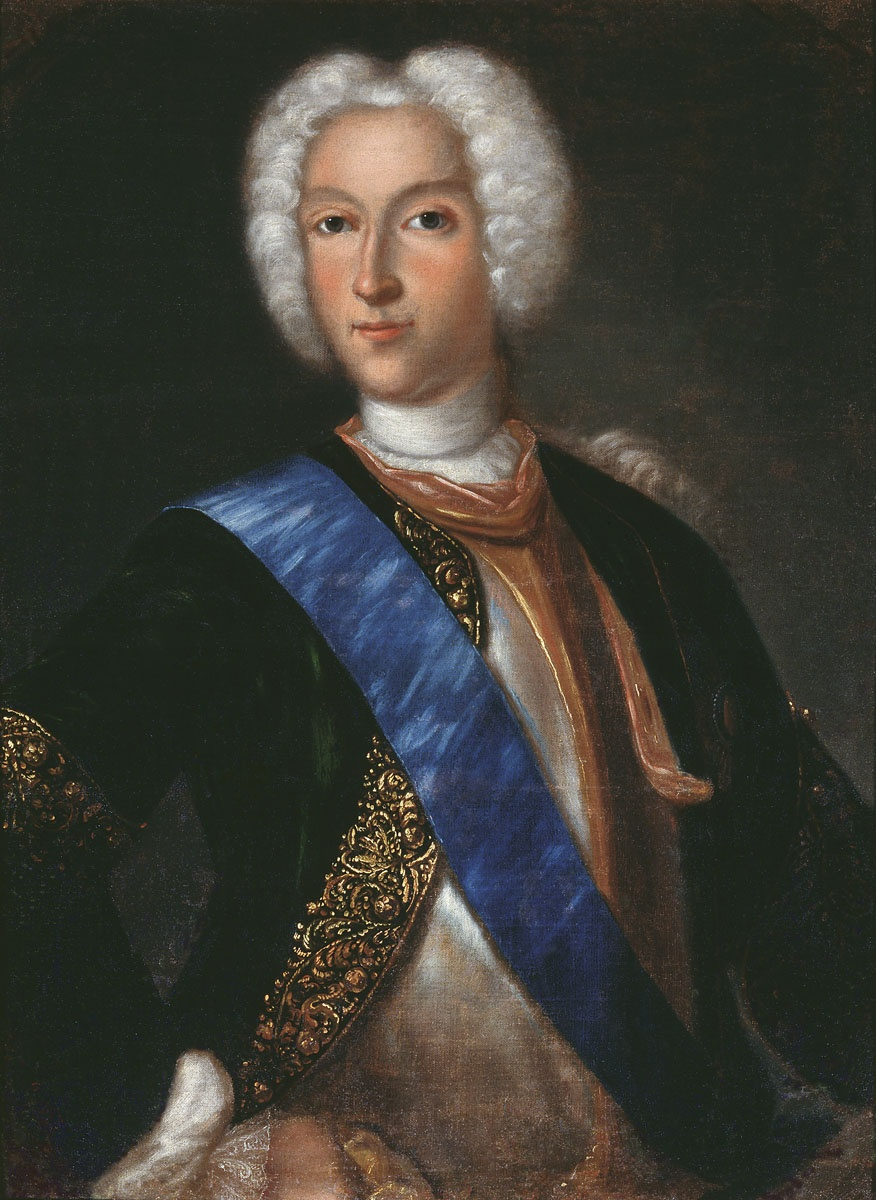
Peter II of Russia, c. 1730

Johann Heinrich Wedekind (15 August 1674, Reval — 8 October 1736, Saint Petersburg) was a Baltic-German painter who worked in Sweden and Russia, for Peter the Great. He helped to establish secular portrait painting in Russia.

== Biography ==
He studied painting with Ernst Wilhelm Londicer, another Baltic-German. After Londicer's death, he went to work in Lübeck and Riga, before returning to Reval, where he became a citizen in 1700. That same year, he joined the local artisan workshop and, shortly after, married the daughter of the municipal pharmacist.

From 1698, it was his wish to be the court painter in Stockholm. Until 1719, he worked primarily in Sweden, although he also spent time in Narva and Reval. During this time, he painted the portraits of numerous Swedish noblemen, statesmen and military figures, as well as several of King Charles XII. It has been noted, however, that these portraits all show the King in the same pose, with variations in clothing and background. The original may have been done during a royal visit to Riga.

In 1720, he moved to Saint Petersburg, where he painted several works commissioned by Tsar Peter, including those of the Tsar himself, the Tsarina Catherine and then-Princess Anna. His appointment as a court painter included Russian citizenship.

From 1732 until his death, he taught drawing at a school for the Cadet Corps.

Most of his paintings were unsigned. Many were copied, more than once, which complicates the process of verification but fifteen have, with certainty, been established as his. Others have been attributed to him based on brush technique. Approximately fifty people are said to have sat for him. The majority of his identified works are in private collections. After the October Revolution, all of his paintings held at museums in Petrograd (Saint Petersburg) were sent to provincial museums.

Most critics rate his work as diligent, but mediocre. After his father-in-law died in 1731, he was tasked with overseeing the family pharmacy, which may have prevented him from giving his full attention to painting. After his death, his widow was forced to sell it.
