= Johann Fischer (theologian) =

German theologian (1636–1705)

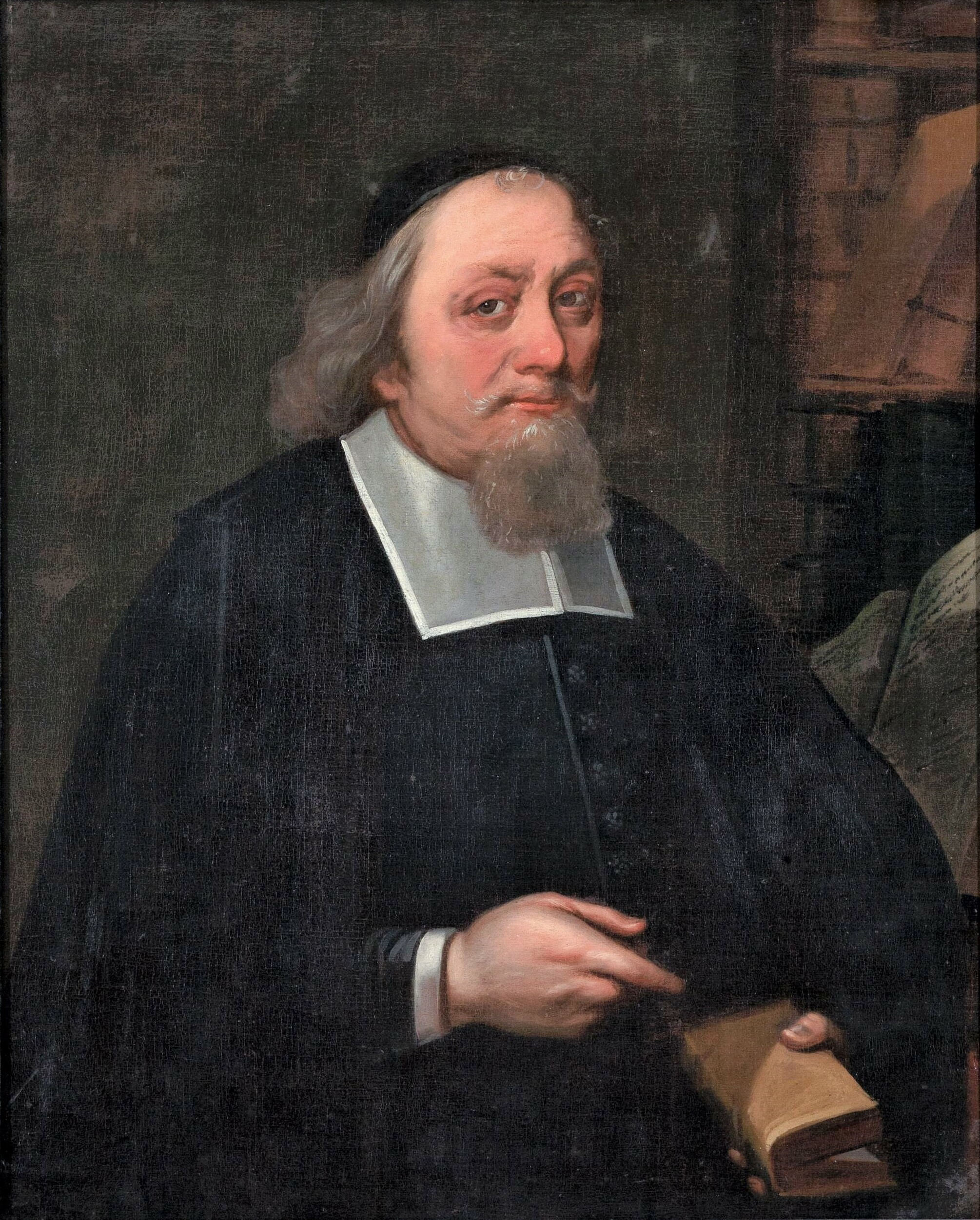
Johann Fischer (1686), by Ernst Wilhelm Londicer

Johann Fischer, also known as Christianus Alethophilus (15 December 1636, Lübeck - 17 May 1705, Magdeburg) was a German theologian.

== Life and work ==
His father was a cloth merchant. He received his primary education at the Katharineum then, in 1655, began to study law at the universities in Rostock and Helmstedt. Two years later, he switched to theology and enrolled at the University of Altdorf. From 1660, he was at Leiden University. After graduating, he became a rural preacher.

He first gained wider recognition in 1665, when he translated the works of Richard Baxter. It also put him at odds with Lutheran orthodoxy. The following year, it attracted the attention of Christian Augustus, Count Palatine of Sulzbach, who brought him there as a deacon. Within two years, he was promoted to local Superintendent. In 1673, he was appointed to the same position for all of Livonia; a province of Sweden which, at that time, included much of the Baltic region.

With the support of King Charles XI, he reformed the church system, despite the continuing influence of Prussia. In 1678, he was named the General Superintendent, which gave him the power to act on his own. Over the next few years, he created state-funded church schools throughout the region. He also founded a printing shop in Riga.

He became an advocate for absolutism in 1687, and was awarded a lifetime income from the royal estates in Lindenhof (now Priekuļi Municipality). Three years later, he was named Professor of Theology at the Academia Gustavo-Carolina, although the Swedish Church Law of 1686 placed severe limits on the activities of Baltic-Germans. In 1693, he became an Honorary Doctor in the Theology Faculty at Uppsala University.

The increasing likelihood of war with the Russian Empire led him to leave Livonia in 1699. He returned to Lübeck, where he was one of six candidates for Superintendent of the Evangelical-Lutheran Church, but failed to win the necessary votes. Through the influence of some old friends, he was able to obtain an appointment as General Superintendent of the Duchy of Magdeburg.
