= Ernst Wilhelm Londicer =

Scottish painter who worked in Tallinn, Estonia (born 1655)

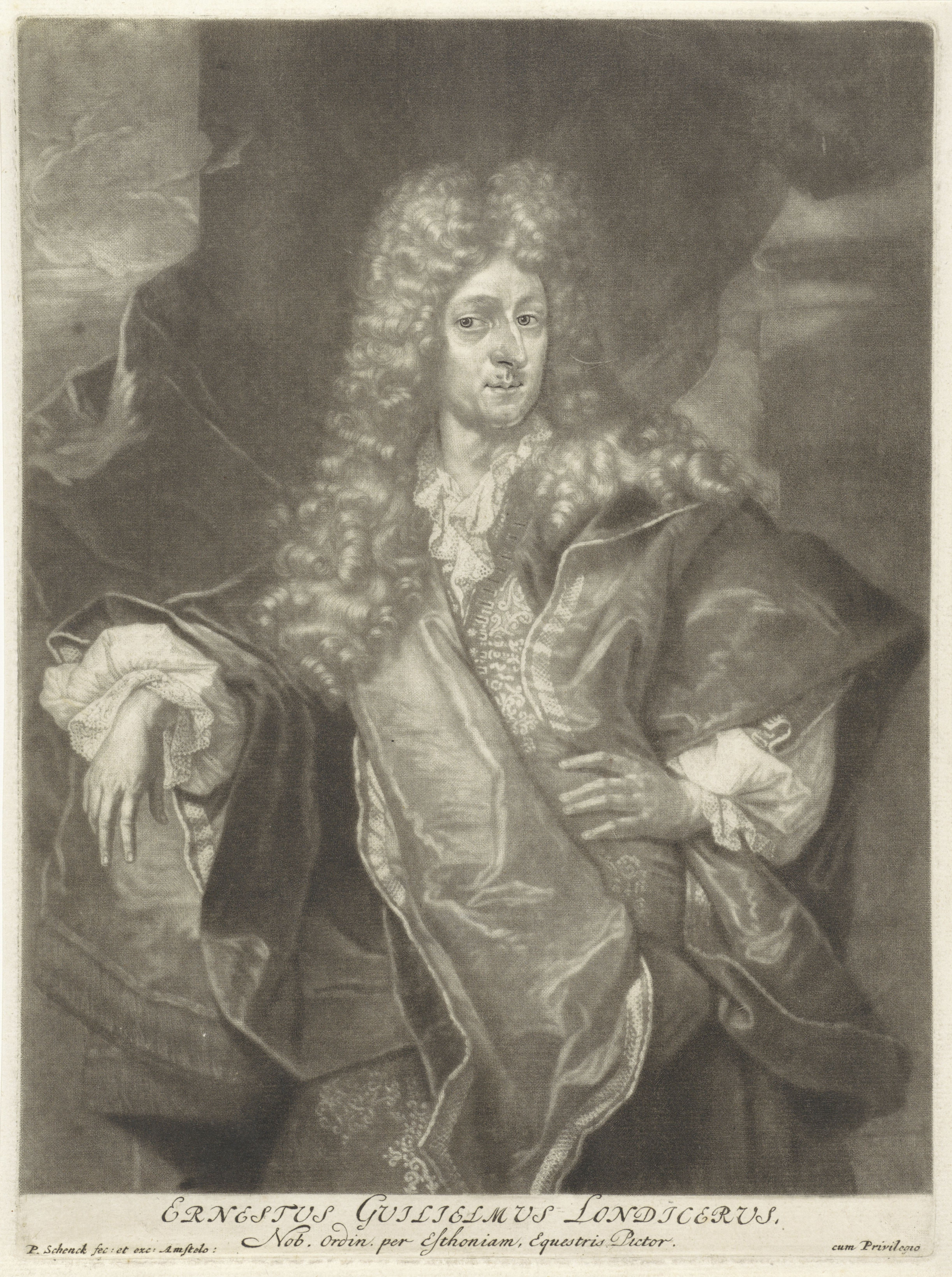
Ernst Wilhelm Londicer, portrait by Peter Schenk the Elder

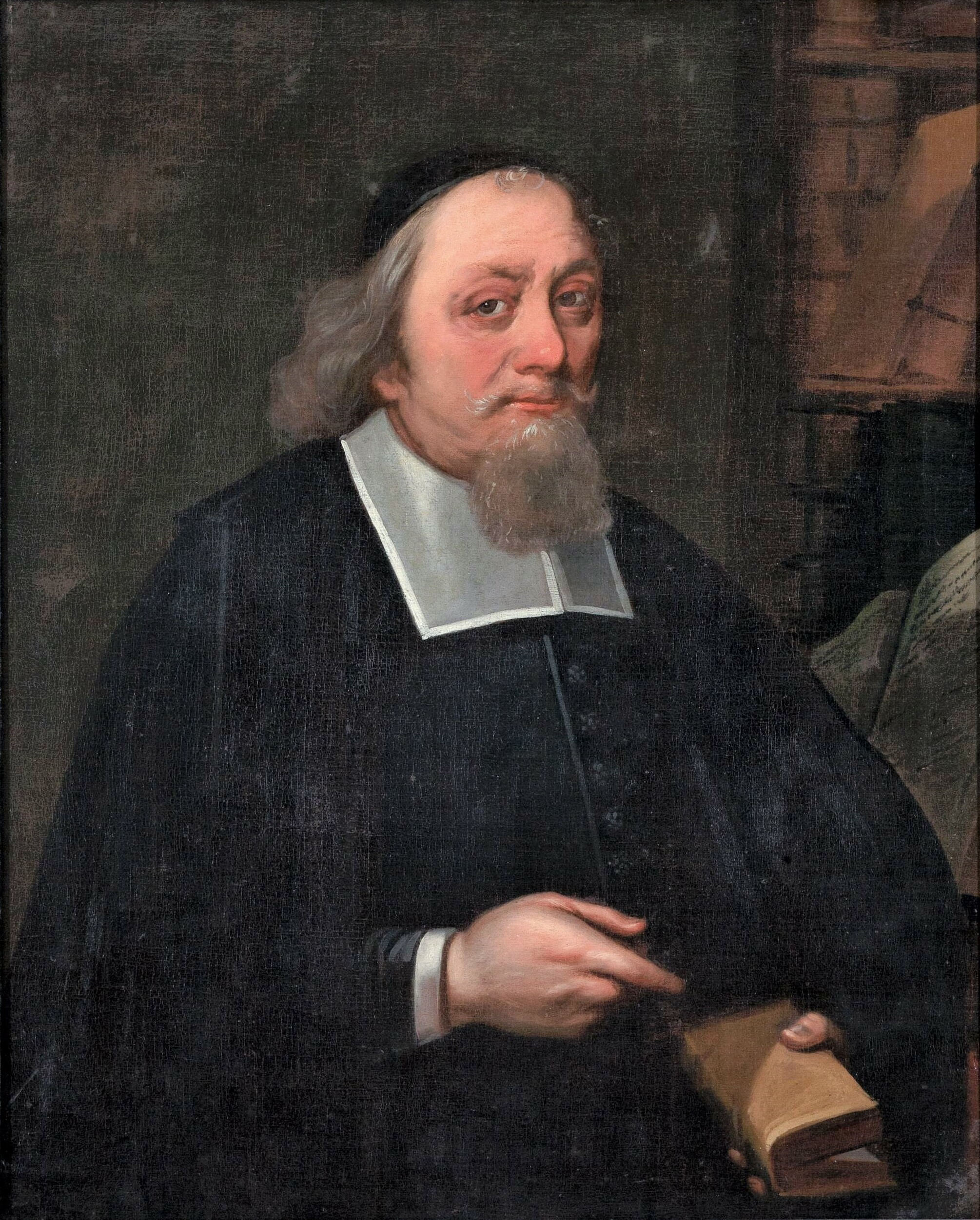
Portrait of the theologian, Johann Fischer (1686)

Ernst Wilhelm Londicer or Londizer (1655, Reval - 9 November 1697, Reval) was a Baltic-German painter who lived in what was then Sweden.

== Life and work ==
His father, George Londicer, was a Scottish-born Lieutenant-Colonel and nobleman. He initially devoted himself to a study of classical literature, but turned to art, which he studied in Germany and Holland. The Dutch influence is especially prominent.

Sometime in the early 1680s, he returned to Reval. He received numerous commissions for portraits, and was named an official painter of the Estonian Knighthood. He took some students as well, notably Johann Heinrich Wedekind.

In 1697, he died of the plague.

His best-known works are portraits. These include Johann Fischer, the General Superintendent of Livonia, Frederick William, Elector of Brandenburg, the politicians, Bengt Klasson Horn and Anders Torstenson, and Bishop Joachim Salemann.

In 1695, he designed the title page for the Livonian Chronicle by Christian Kelch. It was engraved by Jacob von Sandrart. He also created altarpiece paintings of the Last Supper and the Crucifixion, for St. Mary's Cathedral, but they were replaced in 1881.

He was married to Maria Helena Polack (?-1710), the daughter of a goldsmith named Peter Polack (1633–1702). Her brother, Peter Wilhelm Polack (?-1721), was also a goldsmith. They had two sons and two daughters. Their first son, George Johan (1686-1733), became a court chaplain.
