= Carl Nieroth =

Swedish officer and nobleman (died 1712)

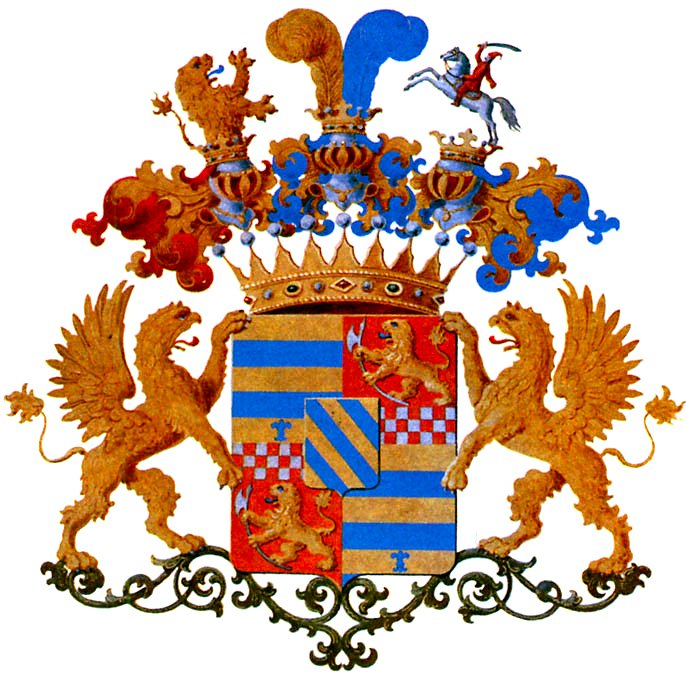
Coat of arms of the Nieroth family

Carl Gustaf von Nieroth (died 1712) was a Swedish officer and Governor-General of Swedish Estonia 1709–1710 (though not formally installed) and of Finland 1710–1712.

The exact date and location of his birth are unknown, but believed to be in Finland. He was a son of the Baltic German Otto Nieroth and Gertrud Baranoff. He was first recorded in 1671 as a cornet of the Swedish Army in Swedish Pomerania. In 1692 he had risen to the rank of lieutenant colonel, in 1700 to major general and in 1704 to lieutenant general.

During the Great Northern War Nieroth was involved in several successful battles, the Battle of Warsaw (1705) being his greatest success.

After Viborg was lost in 1710, Nieroth was sent to try to reclaim it. He assembled 10,000 men, who besieged the city in 1711 but lacked equipment to enter it, and had to retreat. He died suddenly during a temporary halt in Sarvlax manor (Finnish: Sarvilahti) in Pernå parish, on 25 January 1712.

He was married on 7 January 1686 in Stockholm to Christina Margareta Horn (d. 17 September 1703).

He was elevated to friherre and count on 26 June 1706.

Political offices
Preceded by Niels Jonsson Stromberg af Clastorp	Governor-General of Swedish Estonia; 1709–1710	Succeeded by Russian Governor Generals
Preceded by Herman Fleming	Governor-General of Finland; 1710–1712	Succeeded by Gustaf Otto Douglas
