= List of Swedish governors-general =

A governor-general (Swedish: generalguvernör) was appointed by the Swedish monarch as his permanent representative, with both civil and military jurisdiction, over parts of Sweden, from the 17th century to the early 19th century, when constitutional changes made the office obsolete. A governor-general was always appointed as the highest representative of the Swedish monarch in the dominions ruled, or the possessions governed, by Sweden. Conquered, and unintegrated, territories were apart from this, more or less allowed to retain their internal political structure.

The term viceroy is better reserved for the stattholder, the representative of the Swedish monarch in Norway when that neighboring country was in personal union with Sweden, as it concerns a whole kingdom, and notably in the several cases where the incumbent was no lesser than the Swedish crown prince.

Governors-general could also be appointed over parts of Sweden proper, today's Sweden and Finland, and usually consisting of several counties in that part of the country, when circumstances so required. When this happened the royal governor of each county would report to the governor-general instead of directly to the monarch or the Privy Council. A royal governor, regardless if whether under a governor-general or not, held the civil, but not the military, jurisdiction over his county. The governors-general were always members of the Privy Council.

The list of governors-general given below is not complete. Some of those listed held the title of governor, not governor-general.

== Finland ==
The following were the governors-general of Finland:

- Nils Bielke (1623–1631)
- Gabriel Bengtsson Oxenstierna (1631–1634)
- Per Brahe the Younger (1637–1640; 1648–1654)
- Gustaf Evertsson Horn (1657)
- Herman Fleming (1664–1669)
- Carl Nieroth (1710–1712)
- Gustaf Fredrik von Rosen (1747–1752)

== Ingria ==
The following were the governors-general of Ingria:

- Carl Carlsson Gyllenhielm (1617–1620)
- Nils Assersson Mannersköld (1626–1629)
- Johan Skytte (1629–1633)
- Bengt Bengtsson Oxenstierna (1634–1643)
- Erik Stenbock (1651–1654)
- Gustaf Evertsson Horn (1654–1657)
- Krister Klasson Horn af Åminne (1657–1659)
- Simon Grundel-Helmfelt (1659)
- Jacob Johan Taube (1660–1668)
- Simon Grundel-Helmfelt (1668–1673)
- Jacob Johan Taube (1673–1681)
- Martin Schultz (von Ascheraden) (1681–1682) (governor)
- Hans von Fersen d.ä. (1682–1683) (governor)
- Göran Sperling (1683–1690)
- Otto Wilhelm von Fersen (1691–1698)
- Otto Vellingk (1698–1708)

== Estonia ==
The following were the governors-general of Estonia:

- Anders Torstenson (1674–1681)
- Robert Lichton (1681–1687)
- Nils Turesson Bielke (1687)
- Axel Julius De la Gardie (1687–1704)
- Wolmar Anton von Schlippenbach (1704–1706)
- Niels Jonsson Stromberg af Clastorp (1706–1709)
- Carl Nieroth (1709–1710)

== Livonia ==
The following were the governors-general of Livonia:

- Jacob De la Gardie (1622–1628)
- Gustaf Horn (1628–1629)
- Johan Skytte (1629–1633)
- Nils Assersson Mannersköld (1633–1634)
- Bengt Bengtsson Oxenstierna (1634–1643)
- Herman Wrangel (1643)
- Erik Eriksson Ryning (1644)
- Gabriel Bengtsson Oxenstierna (1645–1647)
- Magnus Gabriel De la Gardie (1649–1651)
- Gustav Horn (1652–1653)
- Magnus Gabriel De la Gardie (1655–1657), second term
- Axel Lillie (1661)
- Bengt Gabrielsson Oxenstierna (1662–1666)
- Clas Åkesson Tott (1666–1671)
- Fabian von Fersen (1671–1674)
- Krister Klasson Horn af Åminne (1674–1686)
- Jacob Johan Hastfer (1687–1695)
- Erik Dahlberg (1696–1702)
- Carl Gustaf Frölich (1702–1706)
- Adam Ludwig Lewenhaupt (1706–1709)
- Henrik Otto Albedyll (1709)
- Niels Jonsson Stromberg af Clastorp (1709–1710)

== Lithuania ==
The following were the governors-general of Lithuania:

- Bengt Skytte (1655–1657)

== Karelia ==
The following were the governors-general of Karelia:

- Johan Skytte (1629–1634)

== Scania ==
The Scanian Dominion (Swedish: Skånska Generalguvernementet), was established after the Treaty of Roskilde in 1658 and initially included all of Skåneland. In 1660, Bornholm was returned to Denmark. Blekinge, which had been part of Kristianstad County while under the dominion, was removed in 1680 and placed under Kalmar County. The dominion was suspended in 1670, but recreated during the Scanian War. In 1675, Bohus County was added and it remained administered by the Scanian governors-general until 1693. Halland County was removed from the dominion in 1693 and for the periods 1693–1719 and 1801–1809, the dominion included the counties in the province of Scania only.

The following were the governors-general of Scania:

- Gustaf Otto Stenbock (1658–1664) (Bornholm was returned to Denmark in 1660.)
- Gustaf Persson Banér (1664–1669)
- Fabian von Fersen (1676–1677)
- Göran Sperling (1677–1679)
- Johan Gyllenstierna (1679–1680)
- Rutger von Ascheberg (1680–1693) (Bohus County added 1675; Blekinge removed 1680.)

The following were the governors-general of Scania (the province only):

- Otto Vellingk (1693–1698)
- Carl Gustaf Rehnskiöld (July 4, 1698 – December 27, 1705)
- Magnus Stenbock (December 27, 1705–1711)
- Jacob Burenskiöld (1711–1716)
- Carl Gustaf Skytte (1716–1719)
- Carl Gustaf Hård (1717–1719)
- Johan Christopher Toll (February 9, 1801 – March 27, 1809)

== Prussia ==
The following were the governors-general of Prussia:

- Axel Oxenstierna (1626–1631)

== Pomerania ==
The following were the governors-general of Pomerania:

- 1631–1633 Klas Horn
- 1633–1638 Sten Svantesson Bielke
- 1638–1641 Johan Banér
- 1641–1648 Lennart Torstenson
- 1648–1650 Carl Gustaf Wrangel
- 1650–1652 Johan Axelsson Oxenstierna
- 1652–1661 (?) Axel Lillie
- 1661–1676 (?) Carl Gustaf Wrangel
- 1678–1679 possessed by Brandenburg
- 1679–1685 Otto Wilhelm Königsmarck
- 1687–1698 Nils Bielke
- 1698–1711 Jürgen Mellin
- 1715–1720 possessed by Prussia and Denmark
- 1720–1747 Johan August Meijerfeldt d.ä.
- 1748–1766 Axel Löwen
- 1766–1772 Hans Henrik von Liewen d.y.
- 1772–1776 Fredrik Carl Sinclair
- 1776–1791 Fredrik Vilhelm von Hessenstein
- 1792–1796 Eric Ruuth
- 1796–1800 Philip von Platen
- 1800–1807 Hans Henric von Essen
- 1807–1809 possessed by France
- 1811–1812 Carl Mörner af Tuna
- 1813–1815 Wilhelm Malte zu Putbus
- 1815 ce ded to Prussia

== Bremen-Verden ==
The following were the governors-general of Bremen-Verden:

- Jurgen Mellin (1696–1698)
- Nils Carlsson Gyllenstierna af Fogelvik (1698–1711)
- Mauritz von Vellingk (1711–1712)

== See also ==
- Governor of Stockholm
- Viceroy of Norway
- Governor-General of Finland – For the Russian Grand Duchy of Finland (1808–1917)
- List of Swedish politicians
- List of Swedish field marshals
