= List of Swedish field marshals =

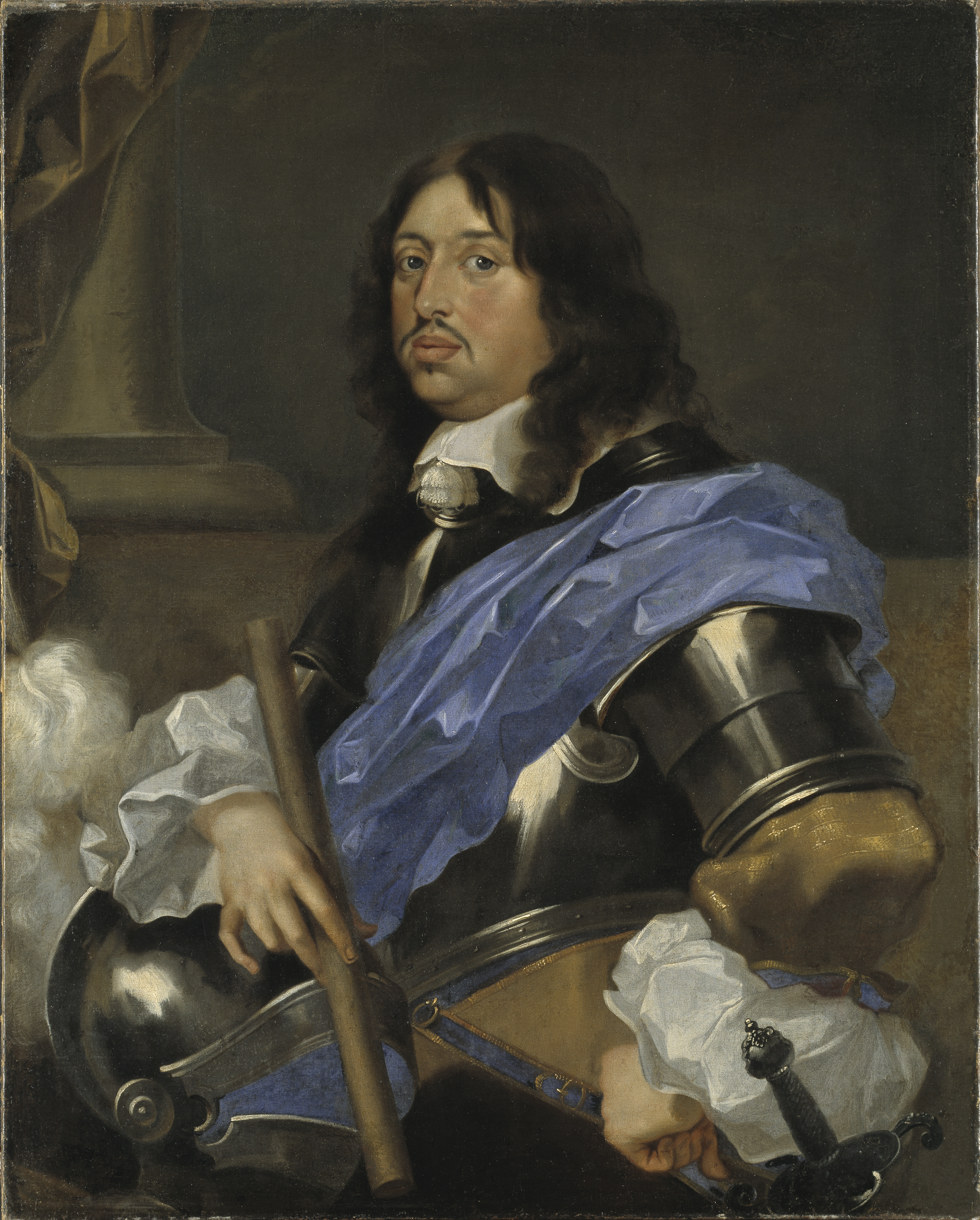
Portrait of King Karl X Gustav holding a field marshal's baton

This is a list of the 77 field marshals (Swedish: Fältmarskalk) of Sweden, with their years of appointment. Field marshal was the highest rank in the Swedish Army, with appointments made from the late 16th century until 1824. The rank was thereafter retained for use in wartime until it was discontinued in 1972.

== List ==
Year appointed	Portrait	Name	Lifespan
1561		Klas Kristersson Horn af Åminne	1517–1566
1580		Carl Henriksson Horn af Kanckas	1550–1601
1582		Pontus De la Gardie	1520–1585
1608		Christer Somme	1565–1618
1613		Evert Horn af Kanckas	1585–1615
1615		Jacob Pontusson De la Gardie	1583–1652
1615		Jesper Mattson Cruus af Edeby	1577–1622
1616		Carl Carlsson Gyllenhielm	1574–1650
1621		Herman Wrangel	1584–1643
1631		Åke Henriksson Tott	1598–1640
1633		Dodo zu Innhausen und Knyphausen	1583–1636
1634		Johan Banér	1596–1641
1636		Alexander Leslie	1580–1661
1641		Lennart Torstensson	1603–1651
1644		Gustaf Carlsson Horn	1592–1657
1646		Carl Gustaf Wrangel	1613–1676
1648		Lars Kagg	1595–1661
1655		Hans Christoff von Königsmarck	1600–1663
1655		Gustaf Adolf Lewenhaupt	1619–1656
1655		Arvid Wittenberg	1606–1657
1656		Gustaf Otto Stenbock	1614–1685
1657		Axel Lillie	1603–1662
1657		Robert Douglas	1611–1662
1663		Gustav Evertsson Horn	1614–1666
1663		Gustaf Persson Banér	1618–1689
1665		Lorens von der Linde	1610–1670
1665		Clas Tott	1630–1674
1665		Henrik Horn af Marienborg	1618–1693
1665		Carl Mauritz Lewenhaupt	1620–1666
1666		Christopher Delphicus zu Dohna	1628–1668
1668		Simon Grundel-Helmfelt	1617–1677
1672		Krister Klasson Horn af Åminne	1622–1692
1674		Axel Julius De la Gardie	1637–1710
1675		Conrad Mardefelt	1610–1688
1675		Fabian von Fersen	1626–1677
1676		Otto Wilhelm Königsmarck	1639–1688
1677		Bengt Horn	1623–1678
1678		Rutger von Ascheberg	1621–1693
1690		Nils Bielke	1644–1716
1690		Göran Sperling	1630–1691
1690		Jacob Johan Hastfer	1647–1695
1693		Erik Dahlbergh	1625–1703
1693		Otto Wilhelm von Fersen	1623–1703
1696		Axel Wachtmeister	1643–1699
1706		Carl Gustaf Rehnskiöld	1651–1722
1709		Nils Gyllenstierna	1648–1720
1712		Magnus Stenbock	1663–1717
1717		Carl Mörner (1658–1721)	1658–1721
1719		Carl Gustaf Dücker	1663–1732
1719		Erik Sparre af Sundby	1665–1726
1719		Gustaf Adam Taube	1673–1732
1719		Carl Gustaf Örnestedt	1669–1742
1721		Axel Sparre	1652–1728
1727		Berndt Otto Stackelberg	1662–1734
1734		Göran Silfverhielm	1681–1737
1734		Hugo Johan Hamilton (1668–1748)	1668–1774
1751		Johan Christoffer von Düring	1695–1759
1753		Mattias Alexander von Ungern-Sternberg	1689–1763
1754		Carl Henrik Wrangel	1681–1755
1757		George Bogislaus Staël von Holstein	1685–1763
1763		Gotthard Wilhelm Marcks von Würtenberg	1688–1778
1765		Gustaf David Hamilton	1699–1788
1770		Axel von Fersen the Elder	1719–1794
1772		Augustin Ehrensvärd	1710–1772
1773		Frederick William von Hessenstein	1735–1808
1773		Samuel Gustaf Stierneld	1700–1775
1776		Gabriel Spens (1712–1781)	1712–1781
1780		Per Scheffer	1718–1790
1780		Johan August Meijerfeldt the Younger	1718–1790
1786		Berndt Otto Stackelberg, Jr. [sv]	1703–1787
1799		Filip Julius Bernhard von Platen	1732–1805
1807		Johan Christopher Toll	1743–1817
1808		Wilhelm Mauritz Klingspor	1744–1814
1811		Curt von Stedingk	1746–1837
1811		Hans Henric von Essen	1755–1824
1816		Carl Carlsson Mörner	1755–1821
1816		Fabian Wrede (1760–1824)	1760–1824
1824		Johan August Sandels	1764–1831

== See also ==
- List of wars involving Sweden
- List of Swedish military commanders
- List of Swedish governors-general
