= St. Mary's Cathedral, Tallinn =

Church building in Tallinn, Estonia

St Mary's Cathedral
- Episcopal Cathedral of the Holy Virgin Mary, Tallinn
- Estonian: Tallinna toomkirik Estonian: Tallinna Püha Neitsi Maarja Piiskoplik Toomkirik
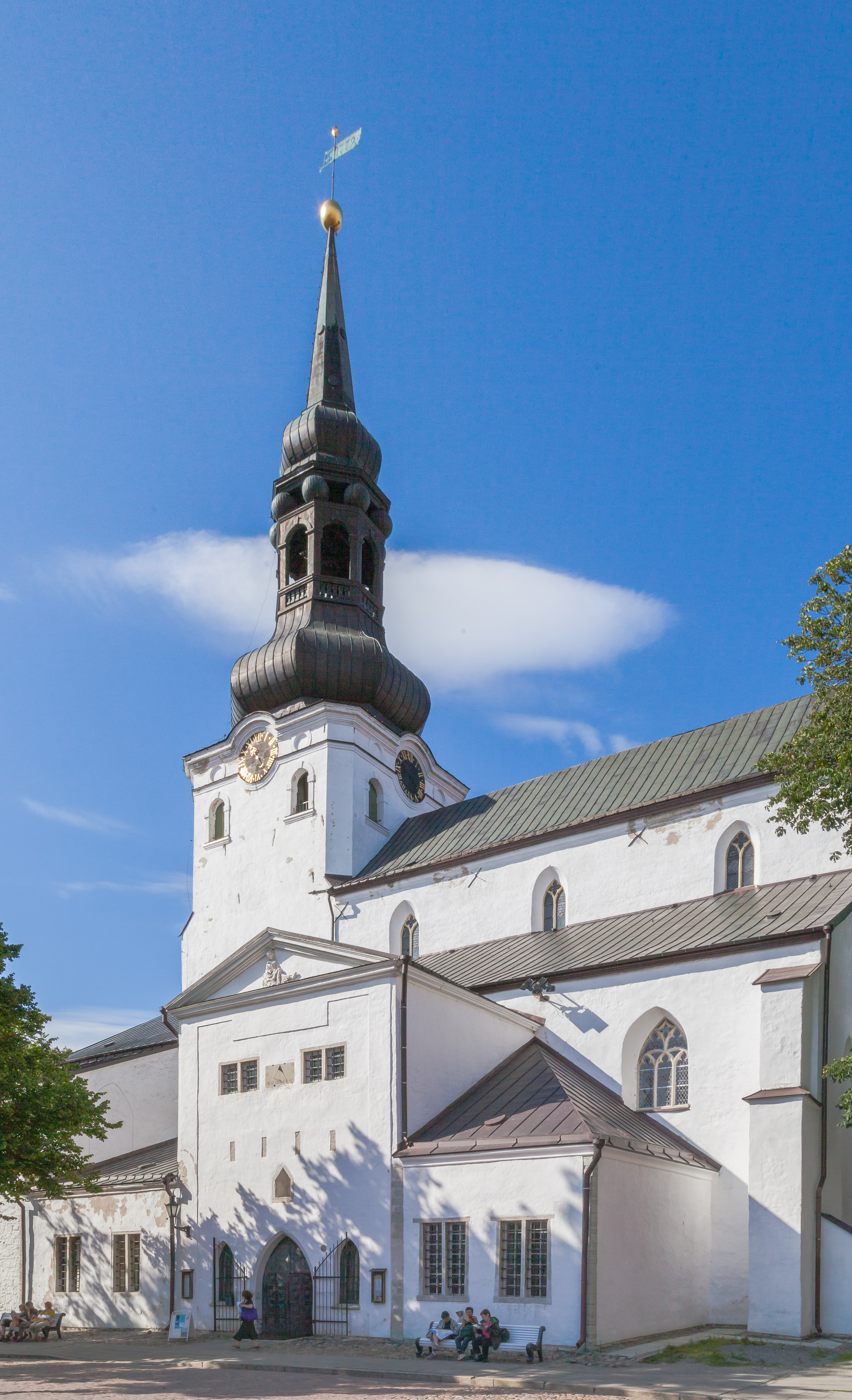

- Location in Estonia
- 59°26′13.56″N 24°44′20.4″E
- Location: Vanalinn, Tallinn, Harju County
- Address: Toom-Kooli 6
- Country: Estonia
- Language: Estonian
- Denomination: Lutheran
- Previous denomination: Catholic
- Website: toomkirik.ee

History
- Status: Active
- Founded: before 1219
- Founder: Danes
- Dedication: Blessed Virgin Mary
- Dedicated: 1240

Architecture
- Functional status: Cathedral
- Heritage designation: Kultuurimälestis (no. 1087)
- Designated: 20 September 1995
- Architectural type: Basilica
- Style: Gothic
- Years built: 1229–1240; 1330–1430 (enlargement); 1686–1779 (restoration)
- Groundbreaking: before 1219

Specifications
- Length: 29 metres (95 ft 2 in)
- Materials: Stone

Administration
- Archdiocese: Tallinn
- Deanery: Tallinn

Clergy
- Archbishop: Urmas Viilma
- Rector: Arho Tuhkru; Joel Siim

St. Mary's Cathedral (Estonian: Toomkirik, German: Ritter- und Domkirche, full name: The Episcopal Cathedral of the Holy Virgin Mary, Tallinn, Estonian: Tallinna Püha Neitsi Maarja Piiskoplik Toomkirik) is a Lutheran cathedral church located on the Toompea hill in the medieval central part of Tallinn, the capital city of Estonia. Established in the 13th century, it is the oldest church in Tallinn and mainland Estonia, and the only building in Toompea which survived the 17th-century fire.

The church was originally established in the 13th century as the Roman Catholic cathedral, after Tallinn and northern Estonia had been conquered by the Kingdom of Denmark during the Northern Crusades. In the aftermath of the Protestant Reformation, the church became Lutheran in 1561 and is now seat of the Archbishop of Tallinn, the spiritual leader, and chairman of the governing synod, of the Estonian Evangelical Lutheran Church.

The church has been a national cultural monument of Estonia since 20 September 1995.

== History ==
The first church was made of wood most likely already and built by 1219, when the Danes invaded Tallinn. In 1229, when the Dominican friars arrived, they started building a stone church replacing the old wooden one. The monks were killed in a conflict between the Knights of the Sword and vassals supporting the pope's legate in 1233, and the church was thus desecrated. A letter asking permission to consecrate it anew was sent to Rome in 1233, and this is the first record of the church's existence.

The Dominicans could not finish the building and built only the base walls. The building was completed in 1240, and it was a one-aisled building with a rectangular chancel.

In 1240, it was also named cathedral and consecrated in honour of the Virgin Mary. In the beginning of the 14th century, reconstruction of the church began. The church was made bigger. The reconstruction began with building a new chancel. At about the same time, the new vestry was built.

The enlargement of the one-aisled building to a three-aisled building began in the 1330s. The construction work, however, lasted almost 100 years. The new longitudinal part of the church, 29 m (95 ft 2 in) long, built by following the principles of the basilica, was completed in the 1430s. The nave's rectangular pillars had been completed in the second half of the 14th century, though.

The church suffered considerable damage in the great fire of 1684 when the entire wooden furnishings were destroyed. Some vaults collapsed and many stone-carved details were severely damaged – especially in the apse.

In 1686, after the fire, the church was practically rebuilt to restore it to its previous state. The new pulpit with figures of the apostles (1686) and the altarpiece (1696) were made by the Estonian sculptor and carver Christian Ackermann. Paintings were added by Ernst Wilhelm Londicer.

The Dome Church's exterior dates from the 15th century, the spire dates from the 18th century. Most of the church's furnishings go back to the 17th and 18th centuries. From 1778 to 1779, a new baroque spire was built in the western part of the nave.

One should also mention the numerous different kinds of tombstones from the 13th–18th centuries, the stone-carved sarcophagi from the 17th century, also the altar and chancel, chandeliers, numerous coats of arms from the 17th–20th centuries. Two of the church's four bells date back to 17th century, two date to the 18th century. The organ was made in 1914.

=== Burials ===
Among the people buried in the cathedral are :

- Jindřich Matyáš Thurn, Bohemian nobleman, one of leaders of the Protestant revolt against Emperor Ferdinand II that led to the Thirty Years' War
- Pontus De la Gardie, Swedish general and his wife, Sofia Johansdotter Gyllenhielm (King John III's daughter);
- Samuel Greig, Scotsman and formerly Samuil Karlovich Greig of the Russian Navy
- Otto Wilhelm and Fabian von Fersen, Swedish field marshals and cousins
- Adam Johann von Krusenstern, Russian navigator
- Ferdinand von Tiesenhausen, Russian noble and military
- Karl Henriksson Horn, Swedish Field marshal
- Margareta Eriksdotter Vasa, sister of King Gustav I of Sweden

== Gallery ==
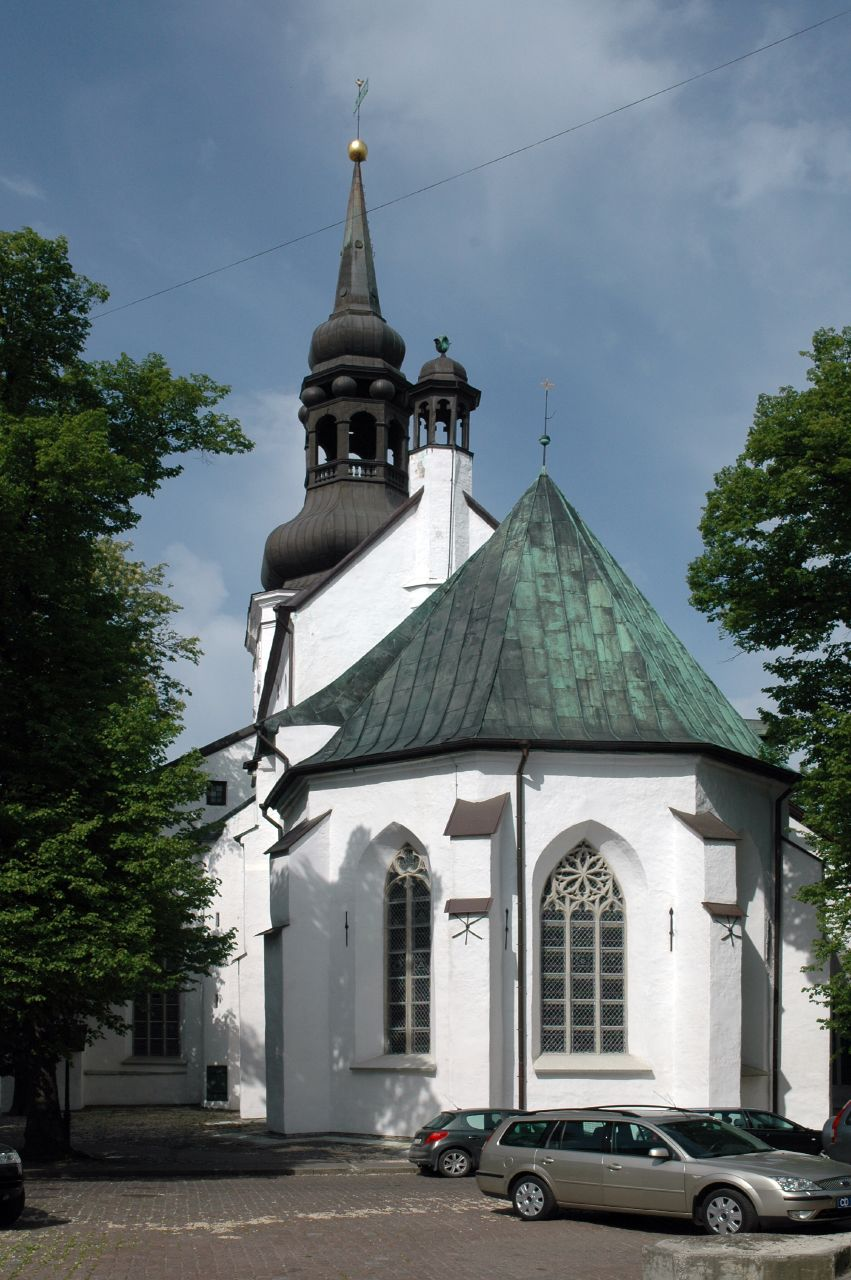
Exterior of the apse

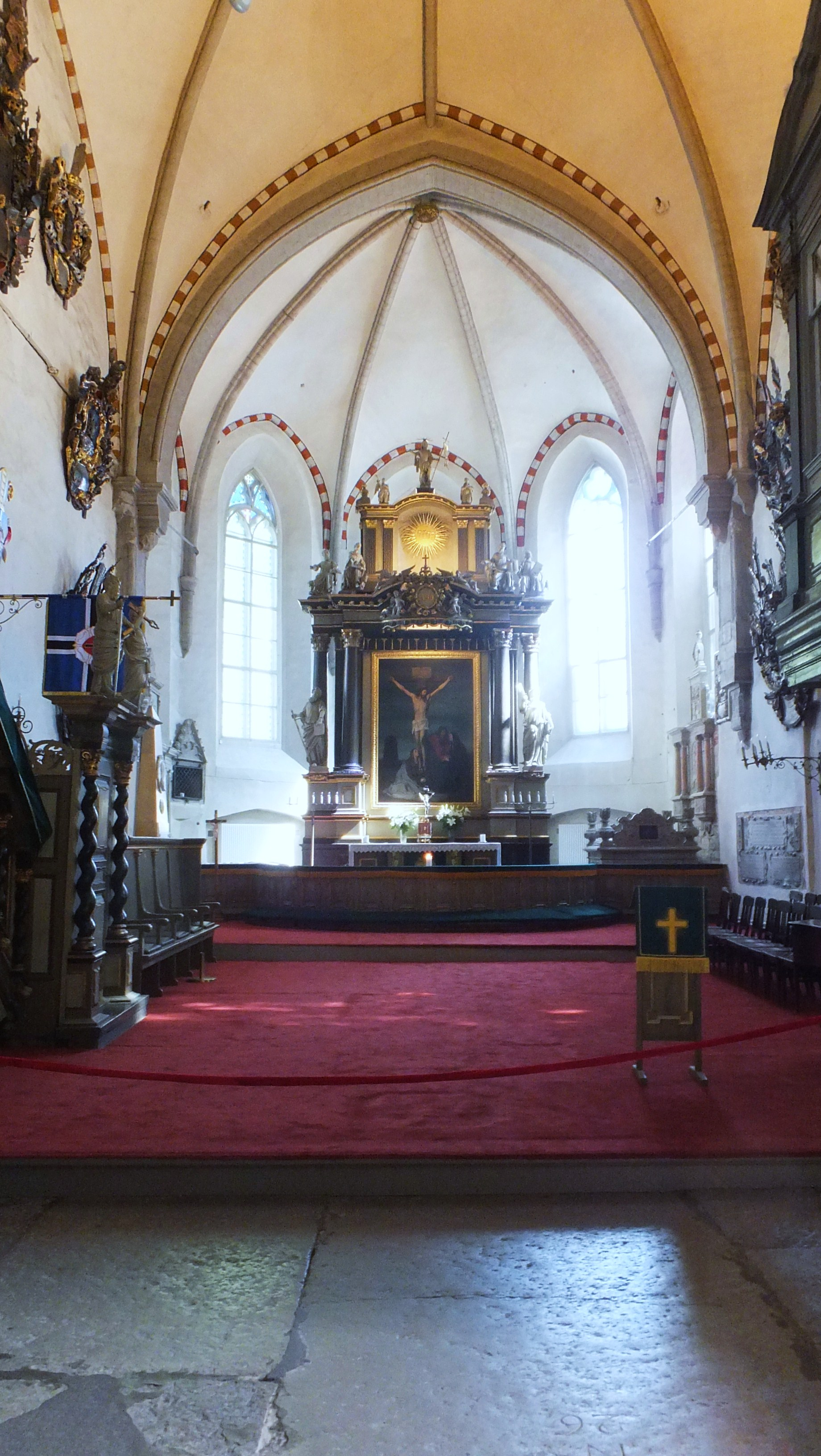
Altar in the cathedral

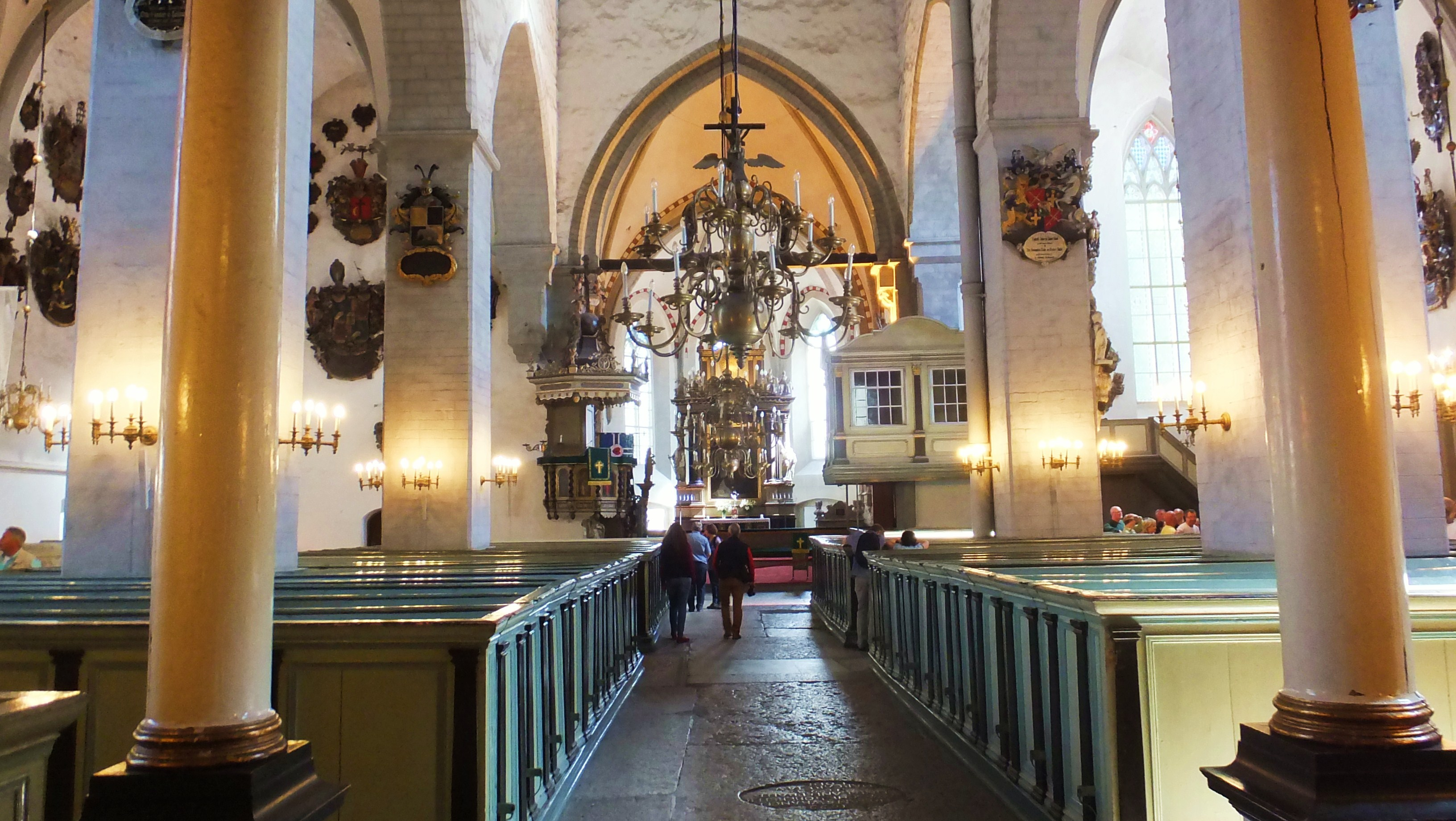
Interior, facing East

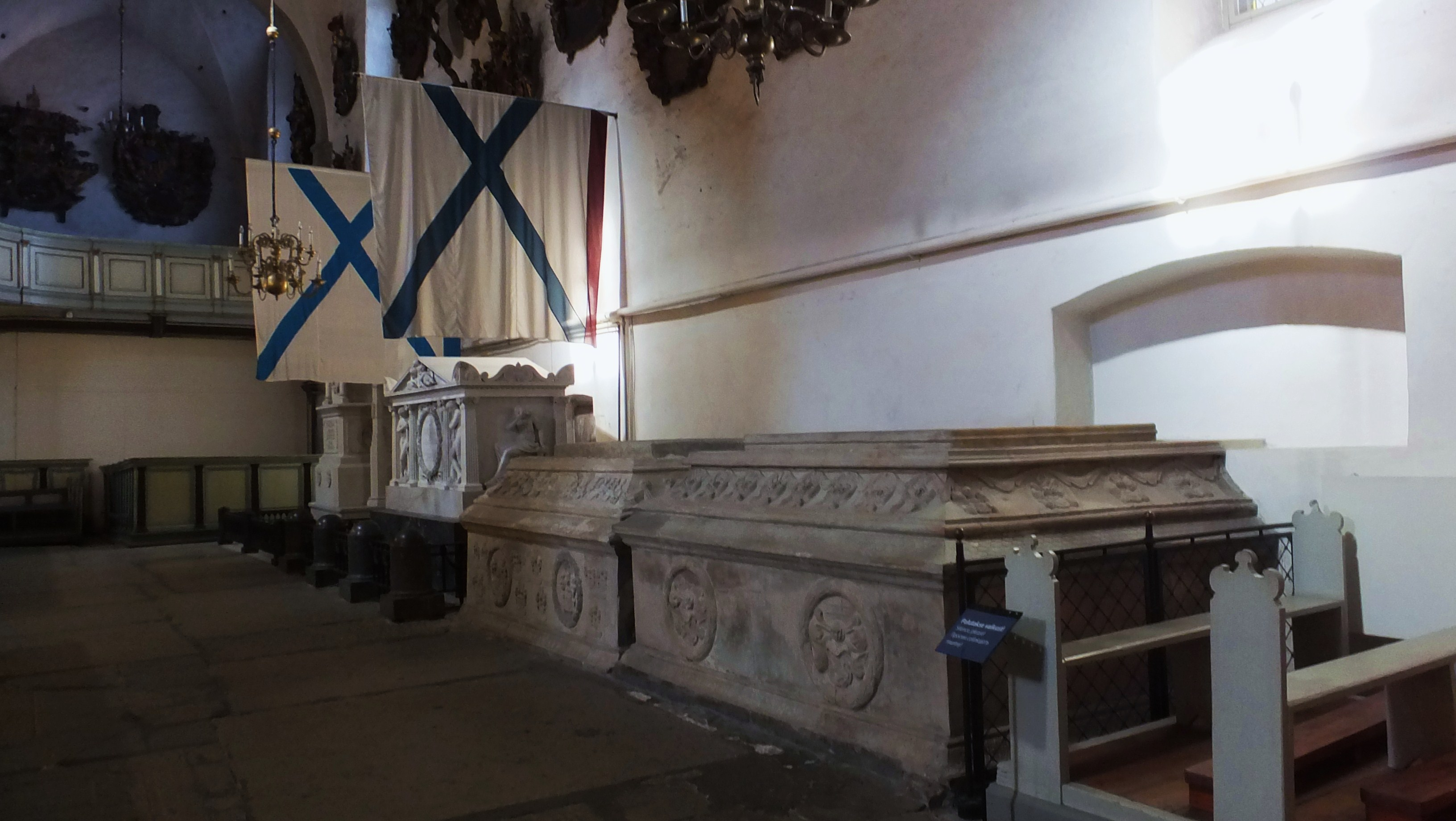
Tombs inside the cathedral

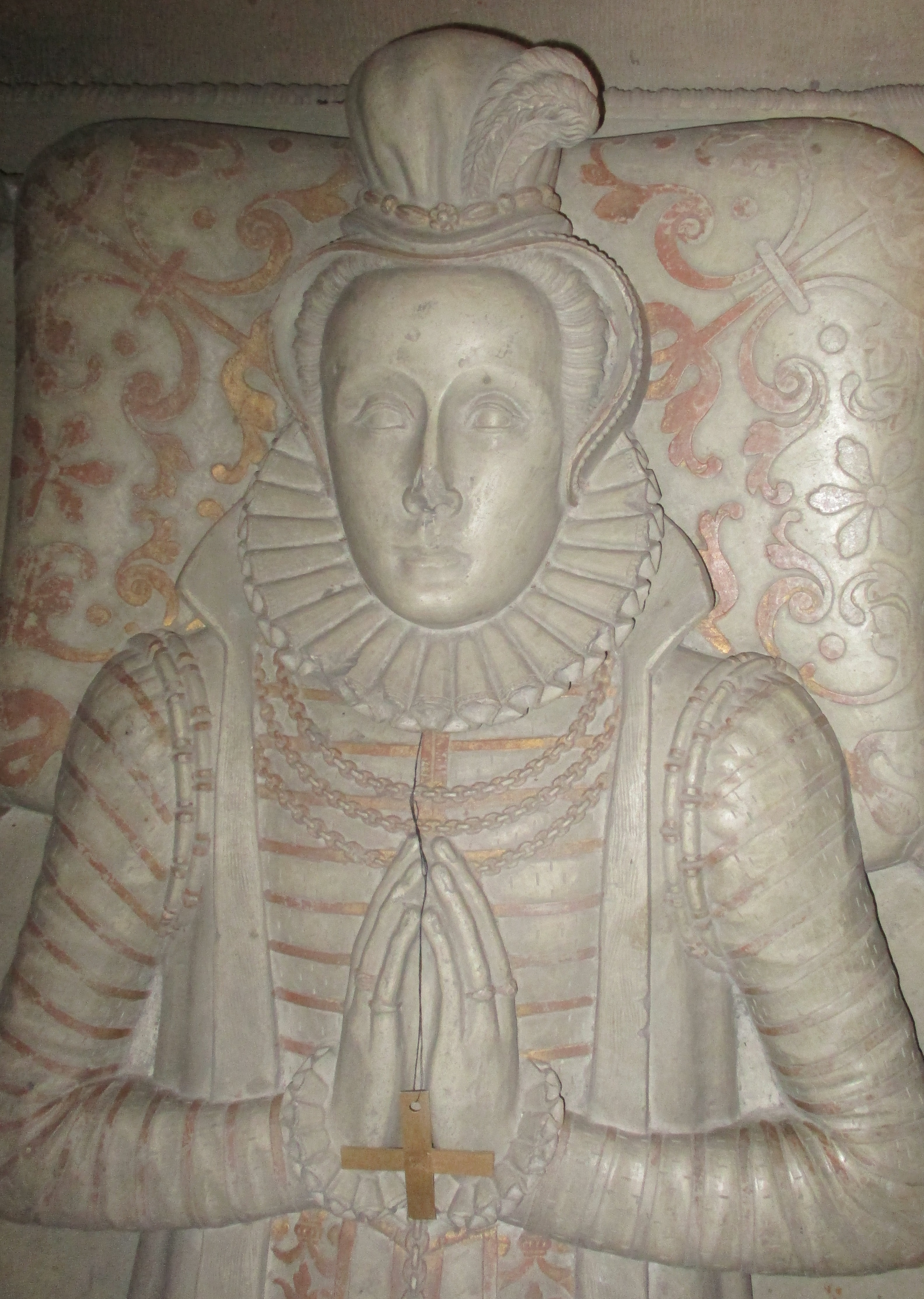
Detail of Sophia's effigy

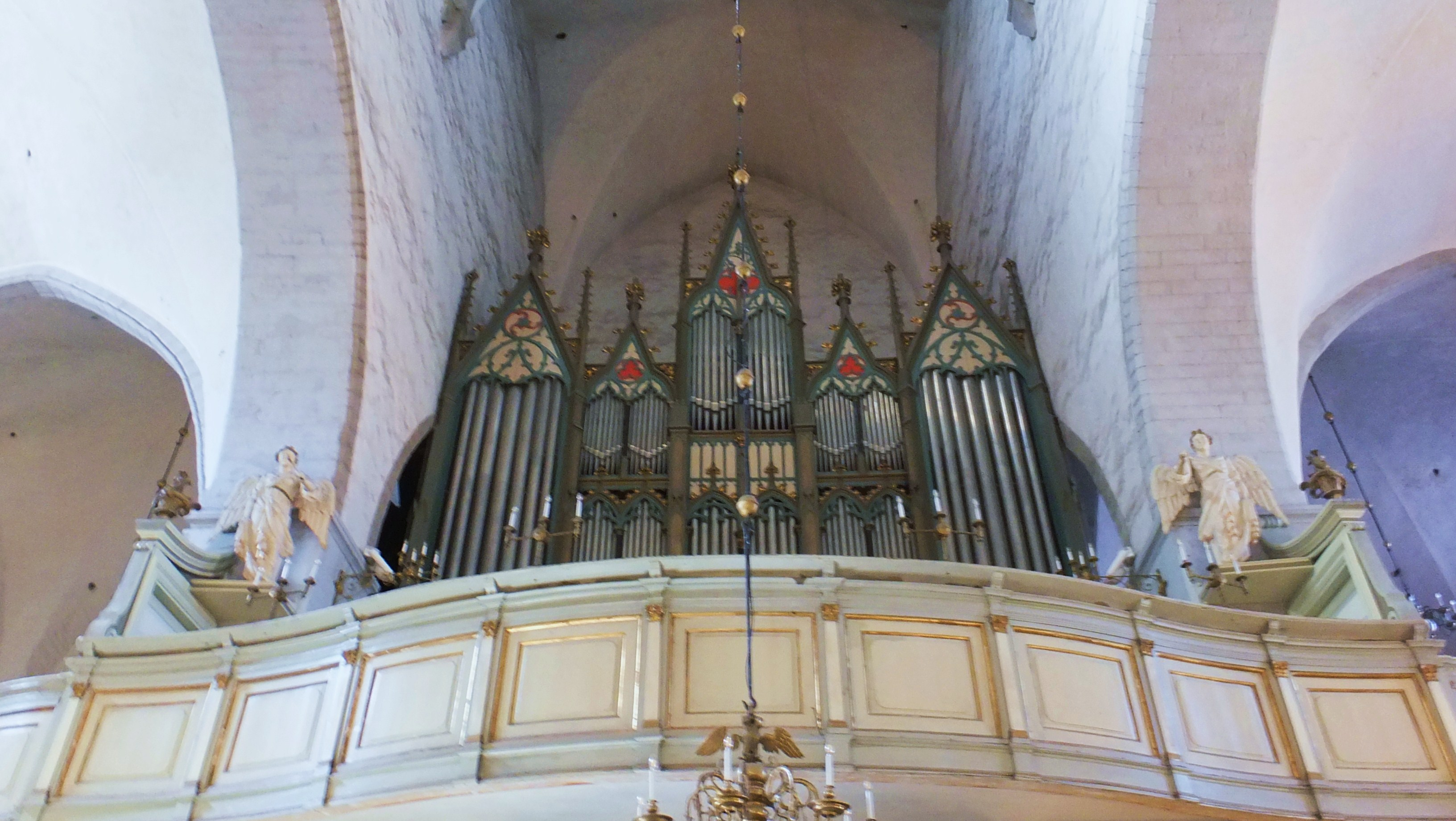
Organ

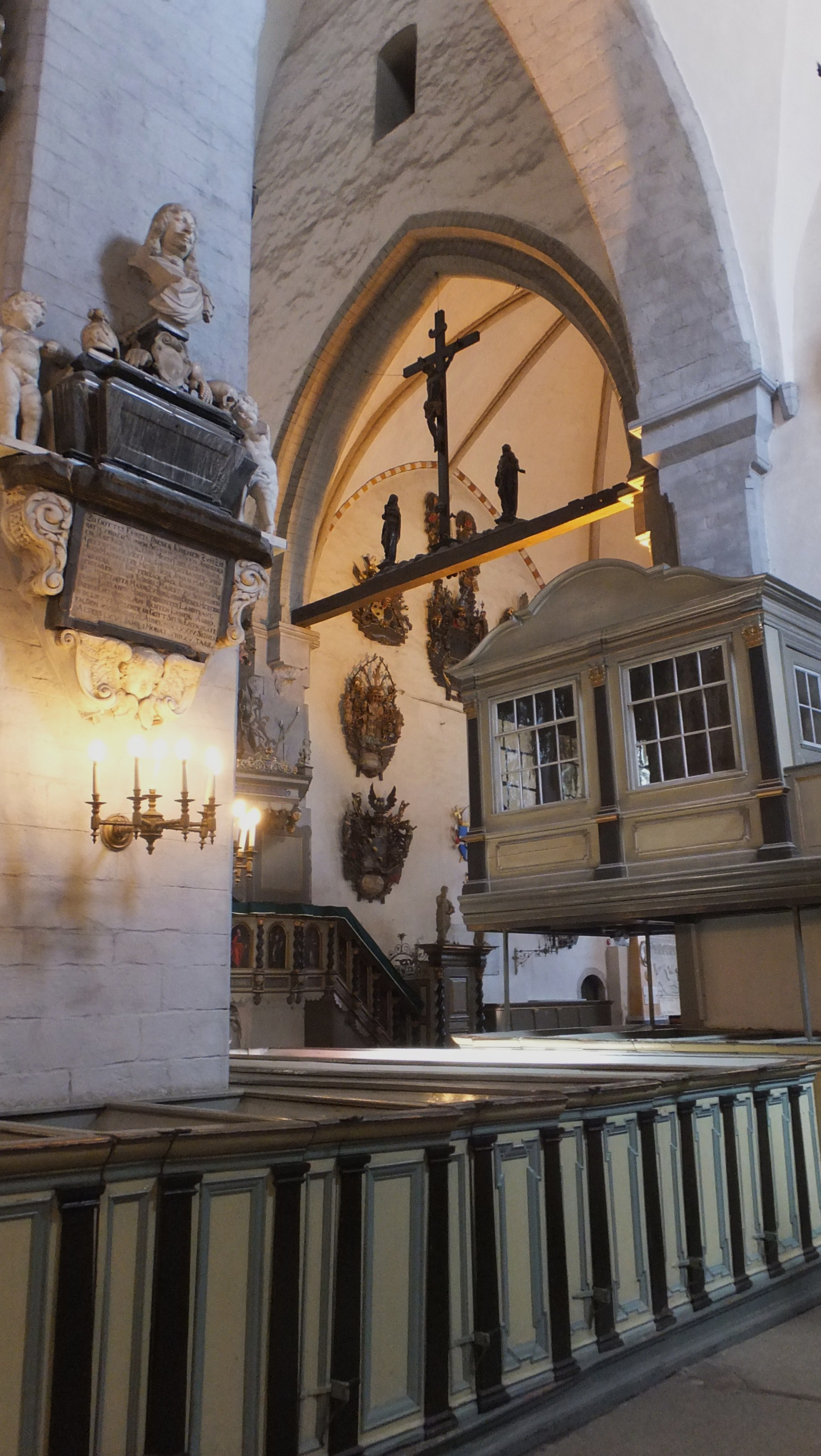
Interior

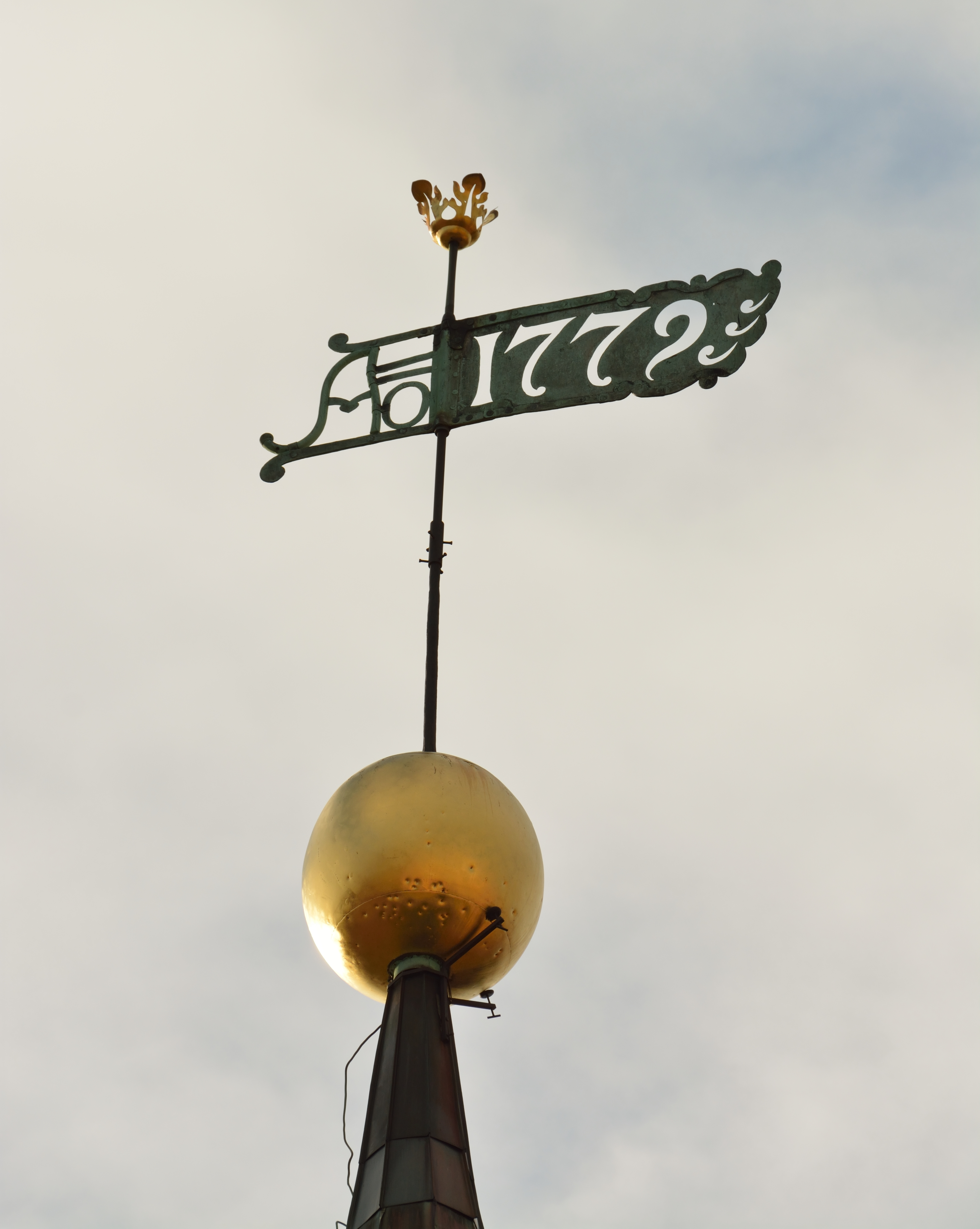
Weathervane

== See also ==
- List of cathedrals in Estonia
- Toompea
- Tallinn
