= Siege of Malmö =

1677 siege

Coordinates: 55.5944°N 13.0181°E

- Part of the Scanian War
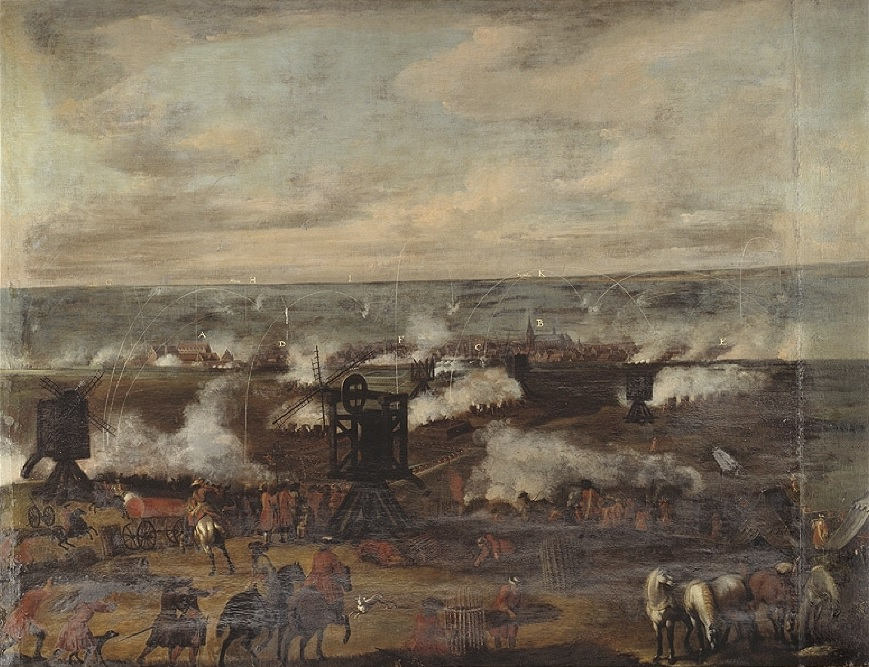
- Battle of Malmö, painted by Johan Philip Lemke.
Date	June 11 – July 5, 1677
Location	Malmö, Scania
Result	Swedish victory

Belligerents
(yes) Swedish Empire	Denmark–Norway; Münster

Commanders and leaders
(yes) Fabian von Fersen (WIA)	Christian V Siegfried von Bibow †

Units involved
(yes) Malmö garrison (yes) Burgher militia	Münster contingent

Strength
1,463 soldiers 500 civilians	14,000 soldiers

Casualties and losses
1,000 killed or wounded	3,000 to 4,000 killed or wounded

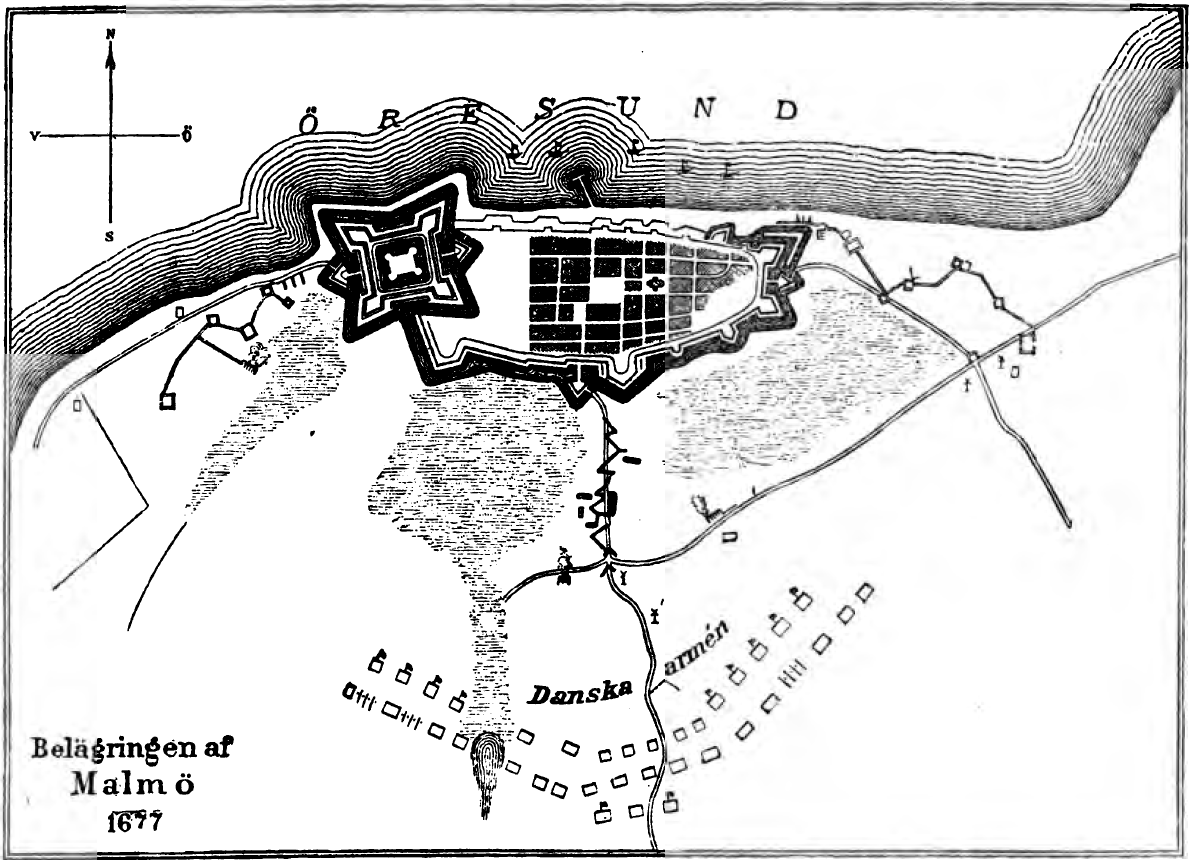
An illustration of the siege

The siege of Malmö (Swedish: Belägringen av Malmö) was an unsuccessful Danish siege on the Swedish-held city of Malmö, fought between June 11 and July 5, 1677. Fought in the middle of the Scanian War, the siege was one in a string of Danish losses that saw Swedish forces under King Charles XI of Sweden strengthen their partial control over Scania (Skåne).

== Prelude ==
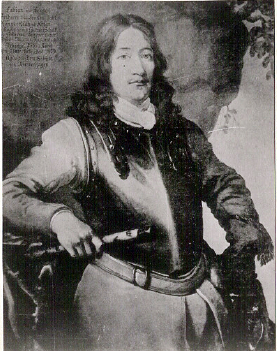
A portrait of the Swedish commander, Fabian von Fersen

The fortified city of Malmö was the only Swedish stronghold that had not fallen into the hands of the Danes during the 1676-1677 period of the Scanian War. It was used as a base for Swedish operations in the southwestern corner of Scania. To win the war, it was important for King Christian V of Denmark to capture Malmö and strike a blow against Swedish presence in the region. The siege began on June 11, with the Danish navy anchoring in the roadstead north of the town and the Danish army camping on the plain south of the town. Danish engineers soon began digging trenches leading up to the castle in the west and to the eastern and southern gates on the city wall. On June 12, the Danes brought in 28 siege guns and 27 mortars, using them to start bombarding the castle and the city walls.

The Swedish administration of Malmö was unsure of the loyalty of the local citizens, as they had only been under Swedish rule since 1658. But reports from Kristianstad about how Christian V had allowed his soldiers three hours of plunder after the capture of the town by the Danes in August 1676, convinced the local citizenry that their best option was to support the Swedes. The Swedish defense was under the command of General Fabian von Fersen, who served as the Swedish Chief Commander in the regions of Scania, Halland and Blekinge. During the siege, he suffered a head wound from Danish musket fire. Fabian died on July 30, following an unsuccessful operation.

On 3 June, the Danish army moved towards Malmö, which received reinforcements from a contingent from Münster including both cavalry and infantry, along with eight cannons. Fersen, realizing that Malmö would eventually be besieged, undertook all available precautions, and by the beginning of the siege, he had 2,277 soldiers in the town and castle, of which 1,463 were fit for service. Additionally, he organized around 500 men from the town's population into a burgher militia of four companies in total.

== Siege ==
On 10 June, the Danes fired a triple Danish salute, the Swedes responding with a double Swedish salute, and thus the siege began. As night fell, the Danes began digging trenches and constructing bastions in order to get closer to the city. On 13 June, heavy artillery arrived from Copenhagen, and Fersen quickly disrupted the siege works, sending a squadron of cavalry to harass the Danes, killing many. A similar raid happened on 18 June, when 60 men under regimental quartermaster Willensen captured several Danish officers and soldiers. At 5:00 a.m, another raid occurred, where Lieutenant Colonel Fritz Wachtmeister raided a Danish bastion with 250 cavalry and 150 musketeers, allegedly killing 100 including four officers, also bringing back one prisoner.

The bombardment became more intense on the evening of June 25, and at 1 o'clock on the morning of June 26 the battle began with a diversionary attack on the Malmö Castle (Swedish: Malmöhus slott), followed by two frontal assaults on the city, one at the southern gate (Söderport) and one at the eastern gate (Österport).

The Danes used fascines, ladders and pontoons to cross the moat. After fierce fighting Danish forces under the command of Siegfried von Bibow were able to break through the defense close to the eastern gate. However, as soon as Danish troops reached the crest of the town wall the Danish artillery ceased firing, which gave the Swedish defenders the opportunity to man their guns.

The Swedish artillery soon began firing on Danish troops making their way across the moat, which inflicted several casualties on the advancing Danish troops and made it impossible for the Danes to bring reinforcements to von Bibow. Inside the town, von Bibow didn't have enough troops to force his way to the gate and open it, and eventually he and all his men were cut down by Swedish soldiers and civilians. Another attack on the other side of the eastern gate made it to the crest of the wall before being repulsed, while the attacks at the southern gate failed to even cross the moat.

After the failed siege, on July 5 the Danish army began its retreat north to the town of Landskrona, where they would engage the Swedish at the Battle of Landskrona.

== Aftermath ==
The Danes had lost the initiative in the war, as well as some of their best troops in the region and some of its most talented commanders. It has been suggested that the latter consequence may have affected the outcome of the subsequent Battle of Landskrona, which followed on July 14. While the Danish navy had the upper hand over the Swedish, the siege was one of several Swedish victories on land that would, in the end, restore the status quo of Scania being under Swedish control. The Danes lost some 4,000 men, along with significant casualties among their officers, Bibow, Busch, Warnstedt, and the Lieutenant Colonel's Plessen and Ellebrecht had all been killed.

Additionally, Granvilliers, Croÿ, Fuchs, a certain Scotsman Meldrum, Ramstedt, and Otto von Vietinghof had all been wounded in the fighting. In comparison, Swedish losses were smaller, only some 1,000 of which most were civilians.

== Other sources ==
- Isacson, Claes-Göran (2000) Skånska kriget 1675-1679 (Historiska Media, 2000) ISBN 91-88930-87-4
- Essen, Michael Fredholm von (2019). Charles XI's War: The Scanian War Between Sweden and Denmark, 1675-1679. Century of the Soldier. Helion & Company. ISBN 9781911628002.
