= Otto Wilhelm von Fersen =

Swedish field marshal

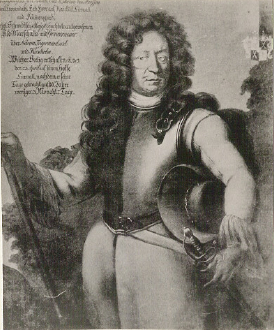
Otto Wilhelm von Fersen

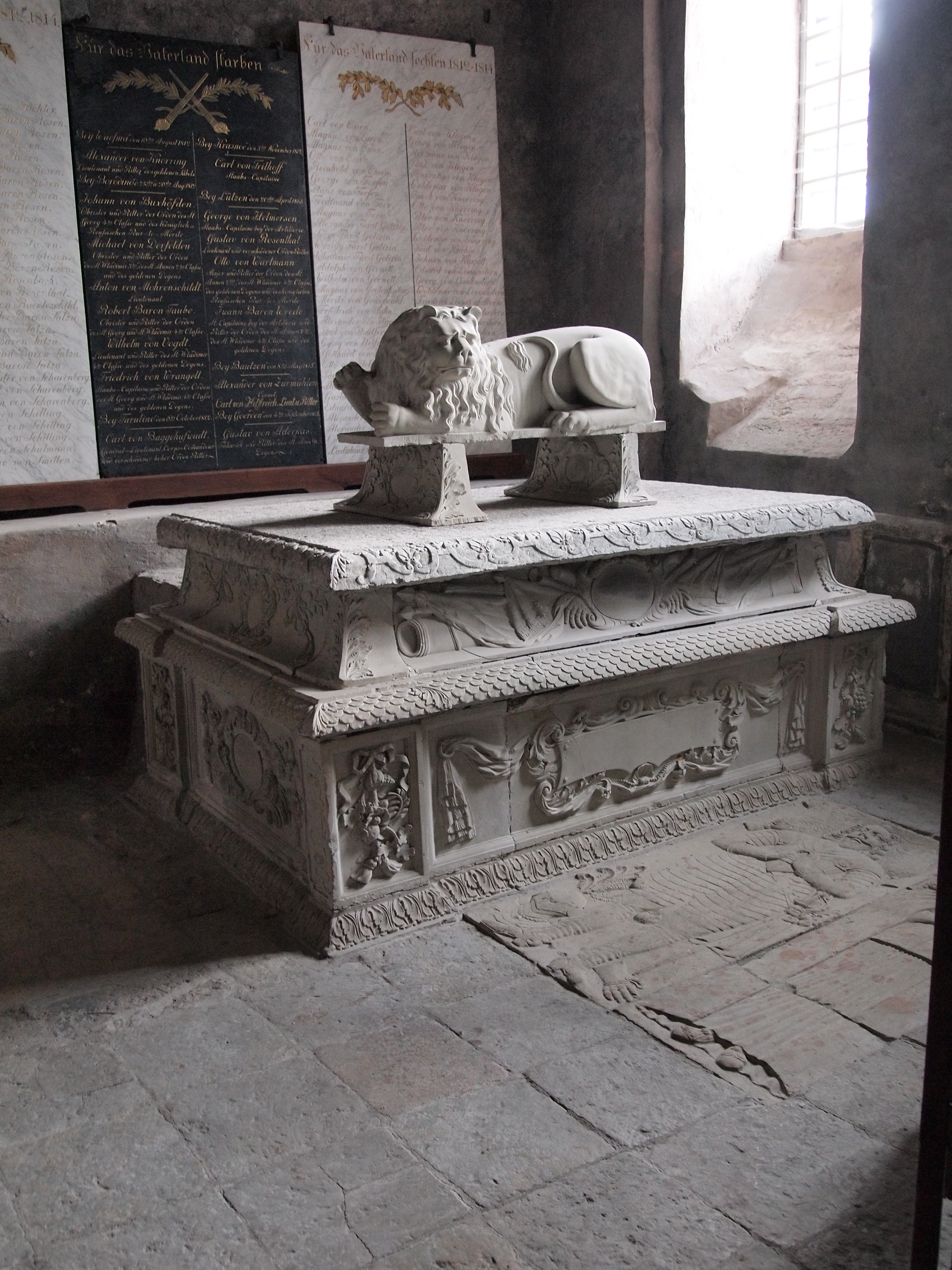
Sarcophagus of Otto Wilhelm von Fersen in St Mary's Cathedral, Tallinn

Otto Wilhelm von Fersen (1623, Reval – 1703, Kurna) was a Swedish general and nobleman of the Fersen family, governor-general of Ingria and Kexholm from 1691 to 1698, field marshal 1693. He was the son of Hermann von Fersen the Elder and cousin to Fabian von Fersen.

In the Scanian War, he commanded the successful right wing during the Battle of Lund in December 1676. He died on his estate Kurnal near Reval (modern-day Tallinn) and is buried in St Mary's Cathedral, Tallinn, where a sarcophagus, probably created by the sculptor Johann Gustav Stockenberg, was erected in his memory.

== See also ==
- Fersen
- List of Swedish field marshals
