= Olonets expedition (1657) =

Swedish incursion into Russia

- Part of the Russo-Swedish War (1656–1658)
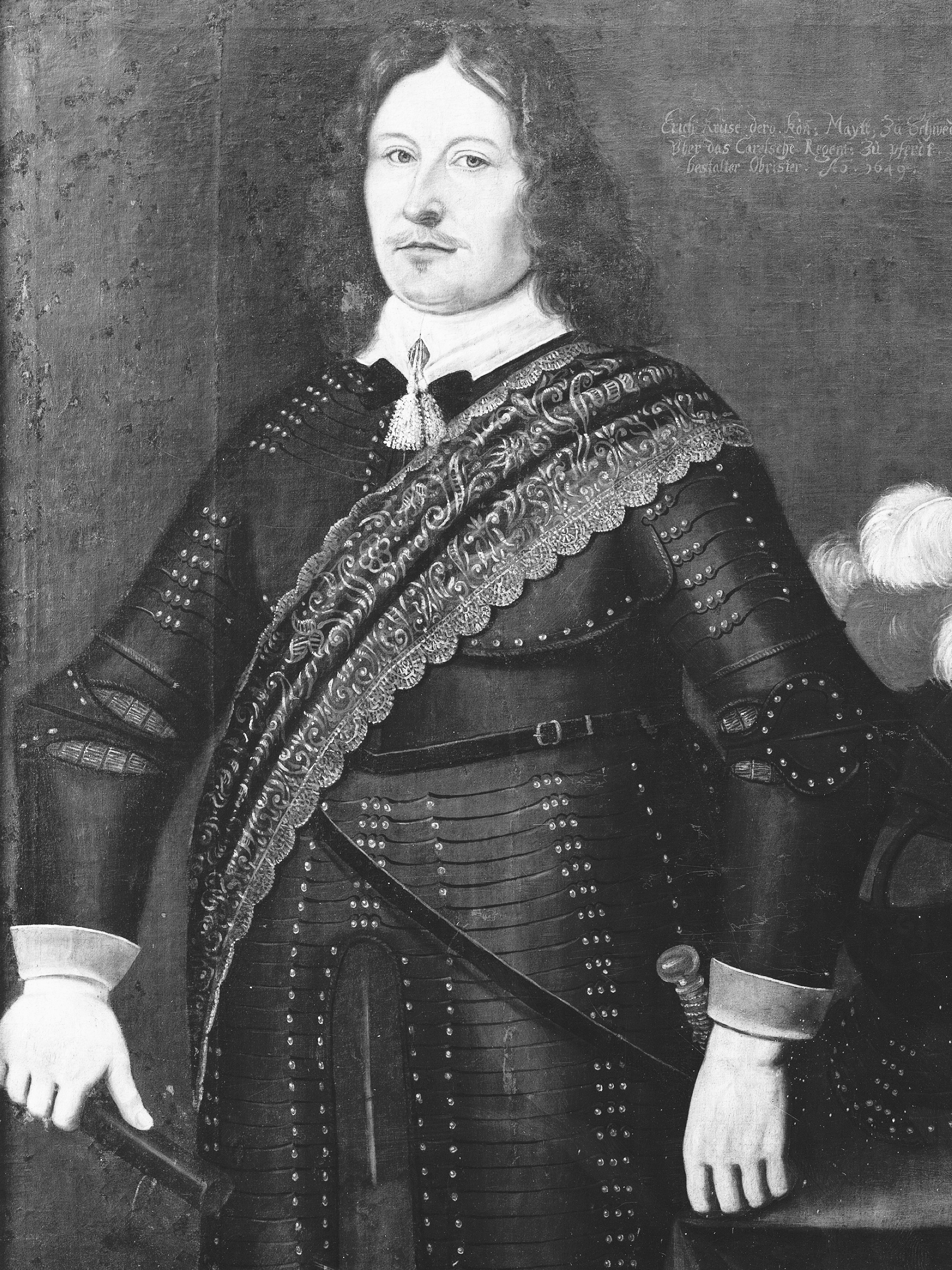
- Portrait of Erik Kruse by an unknown author
Date	5 January, 1657
Location	Karelia, Olonets
Result	Inconclusive

Belligerents
(yes) Swedish Empire	Tsardom of Russia

Commanders and leaders
(Swedish Empire) Erik Kruse	Unknown

Units involved
(Swedish Empire) Forces from Viborg	Unknown

Strength
Unknown, but large	Unknown

Casualties and losses
Unknown	49 killed 58 lodja vessels destroyed
- Heavy civilian casualties

The Olonets expedition (Swedish: Olonetsexpeditionen; Russian: Олонецкая экспедиция) was an invasion towards Olonets executed by Generalmajor Erik Kruse during January 1657 as part of the Russo-Swedish War of 1656–1658. Despite not capturing Olonets like he intended, Erik Kruse destroyed hundreds of buildings and killed all civilians he encountered, drawing condemnations from people like Per Brahe the Younger.

== Background ==
The winter from 1656 to 1657 was colder than expected and was characterised by heavy snowfall. For this reason, and an ongoing plague, the fighting between Russia and Sweden died down, and the war instead turned into one of raids.

There were two prime raiding seasons, in early winter, when the ground was frozen, facilitating travel and the snow was more shallow, and in late winter, around March, when the top layer of snow melted during the day but froze over at night, resulting in a crust on which it was possible to walk on.

On the northernmost front, the Swedes in Finland and Kexholm began 1657 by going on an offensive into Russia. As was common, the snow conditions in the north were favourable than those in the south.

== Expedition ==
On January 5, the offensive began. The planning was facilitated by information given by a Russian captive, by the name of Semjon Säkki, who also led the Swedes around the Russian outposts. Generalmajor Erik Kruse led the offensive, who had replaced Gustaf Adolf Lewenhaupt after his death. The Swedish invaders the attacked the Russian outposts from behind, leading to some 49 being killed with only one managing to escape, while also devastating Russian territory until it came 2,5 kilometers from Olonets.

Scout patrols were subsequently able to report that the Russian troops in Olonets were well-organized, and in comparison, Kruse's forces were poorly equipped and exhausted. Kruse accordingly returned to Viborg.

Kruse's invasion was ruthless, based on his own accounts, during the retreat, he had burned 11 churches, 66 villages, with a total of 304 buildings, and 58 lodja vessels, of which 24 were large and 34 small. The Swedes also killed all men, women, and children they encountered, along with all of the cattle they were unable to bring back. The reason was:

so that great fear arose among these barbaric people as a result of this incursion.

== Aftermath ==
Kruse's actions caused outrage, including among the Swedish nobility and officials, and the Lord High Justiciar, Per Brahe the Younger, condemned his actions.

== Works cited ==
- Essen, Michael Fredholm von (2022). Charles X's Wars Vol.2: The Wars in the East, 1655-1657. Helion & Company. ISBN 9781915070302.
- Ignatius, Karl Emil Ferdinand (1865). Finlands historia under Karl X Gustafs regering [History of Finland during the reign of Karl X Gustaf] (in Swedish). Edlund.
- Lappalainen, Jussi T. (1979). Stade, Arne (ed.). Kriget på östfronten [The War on the Eastern Front] (in Swedish). Militärhistoriska förlaget. ISBN 9789185266098.
- Carlon, Manfred (1903). Ryska kriget 1656-1658 [The Russian war 1656–1658] (in Swedish). Stockholm: Centraltryckeriet.
