= National Register of Cultural Monuments =

Estonian heritage register

The National Register of Cultural Monuments (Estonian language: Kultuurimälestiste riiklik register) is the Estonian government's official list of "cultural monuments", including buildings, sites and objects. It is maintained by the National Heritage Board of Estonia.
