= Gustav Evertsson Horn =

Baron Gustav Evertsson Horn

Governor-general of Ingria
- In office 1654–1657
- Preceded by: Erik Stenbock
- Succeeded by: Krister Klasson Horn

Governor General of Finland
- In office 1657 – 1658
- Preceded by: Per Brahe the Younger
- Succeeded by: Herman Fleming

Governor General of Bremen-Verden
- In office 1663–1666
- Preceded by: Hans Christoff Königsmarck
- Succeeded by: Henrik Horn

Personal details
- Born: 28 May 1614 Lemu, Finland
- Died: 27 February 1666 (aged 51) Stade, Germany
- Spouse(s): Maria Mörner, Barbro Kurch, Maria Silfverhielm

Baron Gustav Evertsson Horn of Marienburg (28 May 1614 – 27 February 1666) was a Finnish-Swedish military man and politician. He was a member of the Privy Council of Sweden and Governor General.

Horn, the son of Field Marshal Evert Horn, was born in 1614 in Southwest Finland, at the time a part Sweden. He became captain in 1635, and a colonel in 1640. In 1651, he was, along with cousin Henrik Horn, raised to a baron. Gustav Horn became a member of the Swedish Privy Council in 1653, and in the following year, he was assigned the role of Governor General of Ingria and Kexholm, an office he left for the assignment of Governor General of Finland in 1657. In 1656 he was appointed general, in 1658 rikstygmästare and in 1663 field marshal. The latter year he also became Governor General of Bremen-Verden. Gustav Evertsson Horn died in Stade, Germany, in 1666.

== Incursion into Muscovy ==
In February of 1657, Horn led a military expedition from Finland into Muscovy, traversing northern Kexholm County with the objective of launching an offensive to destroy the settlements situated east of Lake Ladoga. Exploiting the timing of the Orthodox Easter, approximately 300 cavalrymen under the command of Lieutenant Colonel Erik Pistolhielm conducted a surprise assault on Tulemajärvi. This operation resulted in the death of all the local inhabitants, the burning of the village, and the destruction of the houses of those who remained inside. Additionally, the Swedish forces set ablaze several Muscovite supply depots and wreaked havoc on the Muscovite countryside.
