= Aminoff family =

Swedish-Finnish noble family

Aminoff Аминовы/Аминевы
- Russian boyar and Swedish-Finnish noble family
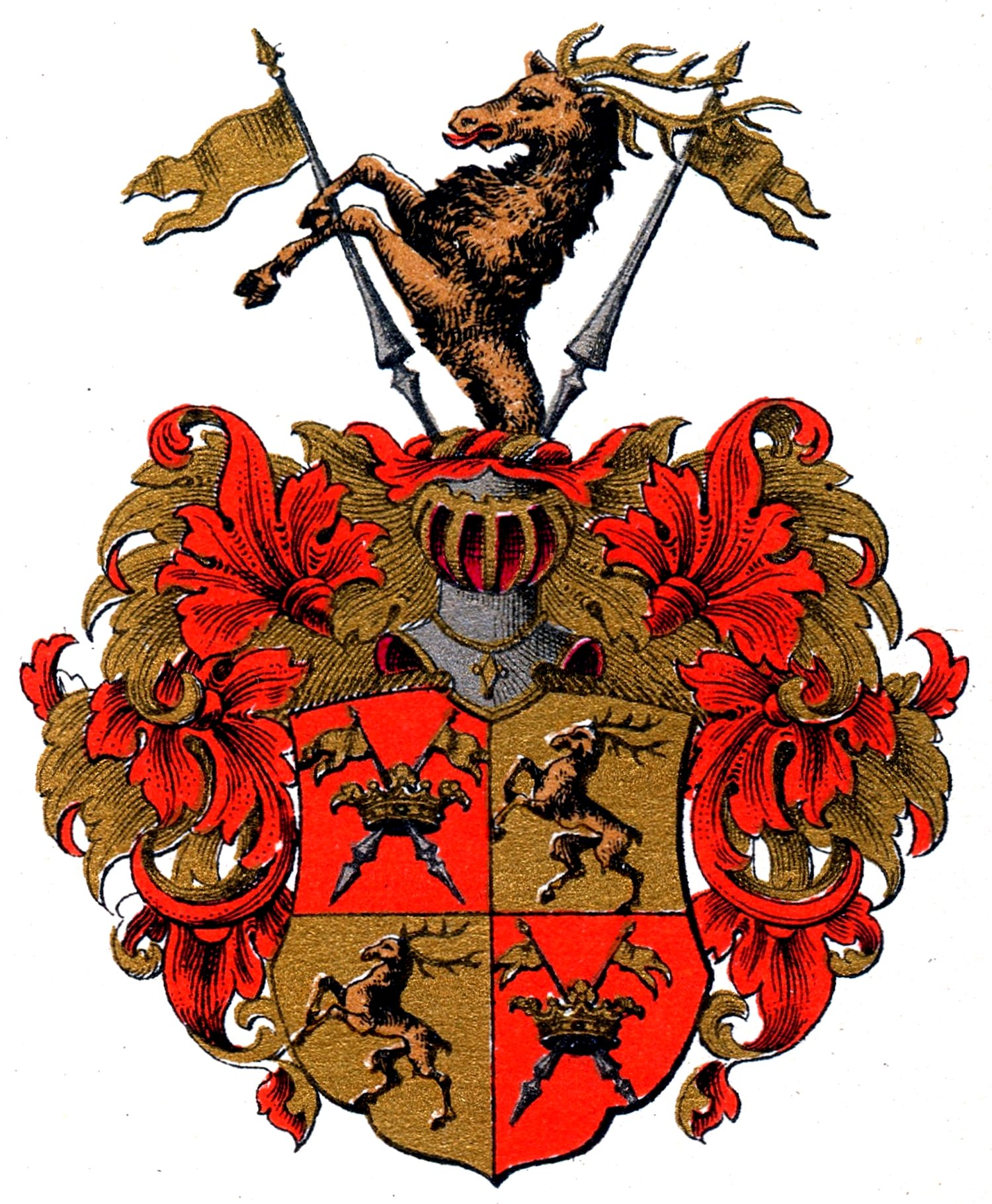
- Arms of the Aminoff family
- Parent family: Ratshichi, Kamensky, Kuritsyn
- Current region: Northern Europe (mainly Sweden, Finland and Russia)
- Origin: Holy Roman Empire
- Founded: 1400s
- Founder: Ratsha; Ivan Yuryevich Volkov-Kuritsyn nicknamed Amin
- Titles: Count, Baron
- Connected members: Golitsyn, Ramsay
- Connected families: Kamensky, Kuritsyn
- Estate: Riilahti manor
- Cadet branches: List: Finnish branch; Swedish branch; Russian branch

The Aminoff family (Russian: Аминовы/Аминевы) is a Swedish-Finnish noble family of Russian origin. The family has been granted the titles of count and baron.

== Overview ==
The clan's progenitor originally hails from Bohemia, the Holy Roman Empire. The family originated with boyars from Veliky Novgorod and hails from the clan of Ratsha, a court servant (tiun) to Prince Vsevolod II of Kiev. Later it split in two branches: the Russian and Nordic. The Russian Aminovs were a lineage of the Kuritsyn boyar family, who, in turn, were offspring of the Novgorodian Kamensky clan. The Russian branch is thought to be extinct.

The Nordic branches and their members resides in Sweden and in Finland, and its genealogy branches are represented in Sweden's and Finland's Houses of Nobility in Stockholm and Helsinki.

Aminoff's is a traditional military family but in 1900s and 2000s they have been involved more in business and industry and as public servants. Aminoff noble family is still active, and it has plenty of family members in Sweden and in Finland.

== Russian branch ==
The Aminov family claimed their descent from the legendary Ratsha, who is also believed to be the progenitor of the Pushkins, Buturlins and other families. The Aminovs are actual descendants of the Kamensky family through boyar to Grand Duke Vasily I of Moscow Roman Ivanovich Kamensky, who owned the Kamenka of Bezhetsky uyezd, Veliky Novgorod. Roman Ivanovich was a descendant of Gavrila Alexich, boyar to Prince Alexander Nevsky, through which they are direct descendants of Ratsha. Ratsha's descendant Ivan Yuryevich (Volkov) syn Kurytsyn nicknamed Amin', the son of Yuri Ggirogyevich Kamensky nicknamed 'Volk' (i.e. wolf) is the actual progenitor of the family. Nikita Ivanovich Aminov took part in the siege of Kazan in 1552, where he was killed in action. The Russian branch died out in the 18th century.

== Swedish branch ==
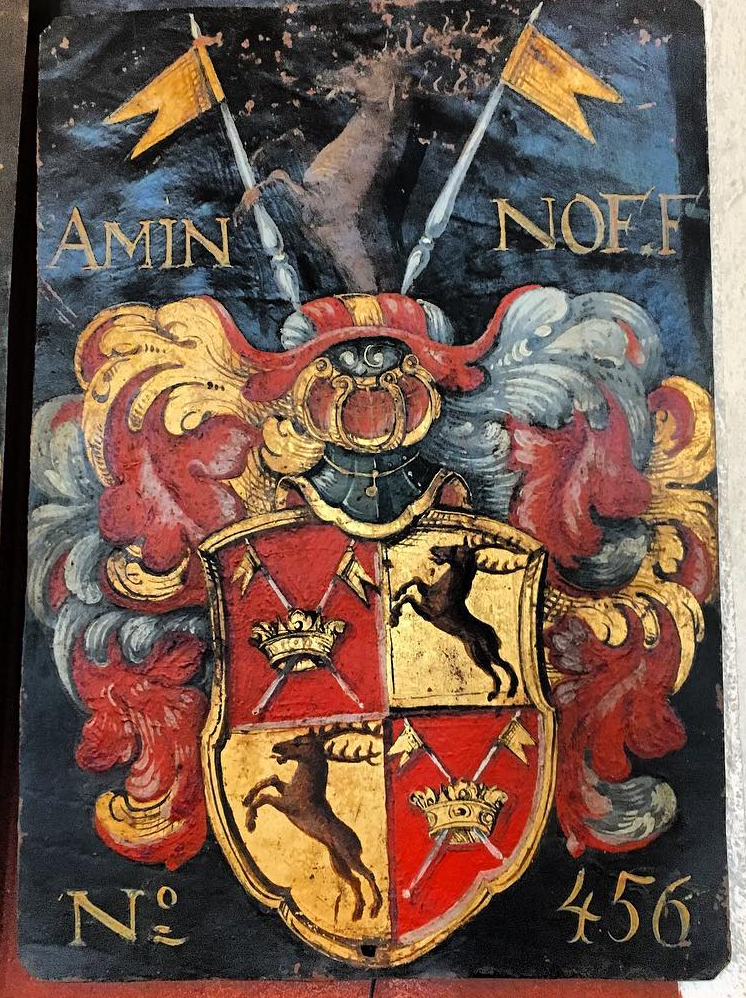
Aminoff family crest at the Swedish House of Nobility

The Swedish branch of the Aminoff family was introduced at the Swedish House of Nobility in 1650, No. 446. The Swedish branch was established in 1618 when The great-grandson of Nikita Aminov, Fyodor Grigoryevich Aminov (circa 1560 – March 28, 1628), voivode at Ivangorod fortress. In 1611, during the Ingrian War and the Time of Troubles, he surrendered the town to the Swedes and switched to their side. He moved to the Swedish territory with his immediate family. Soon he was appointed the governor of the Swedish Gdov. Teodor Gregorievitj Aminoff (Fyodor Grigoryevich Aminov) was then naturalized as a Swedish nobleman. Fyodor Aminov's mother was Princess Helena Ivanova Golitsyn, daughter of Great Novgorod's Governor, Prince Ivan Jurivich Golitsyn.

== Finnish branch ==
The Finnish branch of the Aminoff family, a subbranch of the Swedish branch, was introduced at the Finnish House of Nobility in 1818. The Finnish branch is reportedly seen as one of the biggest noble families of Finland, in terms of the number of members, along with Schauman, Blåfield and Ehrnrooth. Prominent members of the Finnish branch includes: Ivar Aminoff, Finnish Minister of Defense.

== Notable members ==
- Henrik Johan Aminoff (1680–1758), lieutenant general
- Carl Mauritz Aminoff (1728–1798), lieutenant General, director of the Swedish Royal Army Pension Fund
- Adolf Aminoff (1733–1800), major general and commander of Savo Brigade
- Johan Fredrik Aminoff (1756–1842), count, general, statesman
- Feodor Mauritz Aminoff (1759-1829), Swedish adjutant general to King Gustav IV Adolf of Sweden
- Johan Gabriel Aminoff (1767–1828), major general
- Ivan Feodor Aminoff (1797–1855), Swedish chamberlain and adjutant to King Charles XIV John of Sweden
- Gustaf Aminoff (1771–1836), major general, governor
- Adolf Aminoff (1806–1884), count, general
- Berndt Adolf Carl Gregori (1809–1875), colonel, statesman
- Georg Feodor Ivan Aminoff (1832-1888), Swedish chamberlain
- Wilhelm Sixten Gregorius Aminoff (1838–1909), chamberlain of Sweden's Queen Mother Josephine
- Johan Fredrik Gustaf Aminoff (1844–1899), lieutenant general, governor
- Adolf Petter Johannes Aminoff (1856–1938), major general
- Iwan T. Aminoff (1868-1928), lieutenant colonel, science fiction author
- Ivar Aminoff (1868–1931), Defense Minister of Finland, politician
- Gregor Carl Georg Aminoff (1872–1934), adjutant of King of Sweden Gustav V
- Georg Erik Karl Wilhelm (1895-1977), Swedish chamberlain to King Gustaf V of Sweden
- Alexis Aminoff (1897–1977), diplomat and chamberlain of Duke and Duchess of Västergötland
- Carl Göran Aminoff (1916–2001), CEO of Insurance Company Varma and Minister for Foreign Trade of Finland
- Marianne Aminoff (1916–1984), a Swedish film actress
- Sten Gregor Aminoff (1918–2000), ambassador of Sweden in New Zealand and Western Samoa
- Gregor Aminoff (1927-2015), Swedish baron, chamberlain and master of the hunt to King Gustaf VI Adolf and King Carl XVI Gustaf

== See also ==
- Gregori Aminoff Prize
- Russian bayors

== Gallery ==
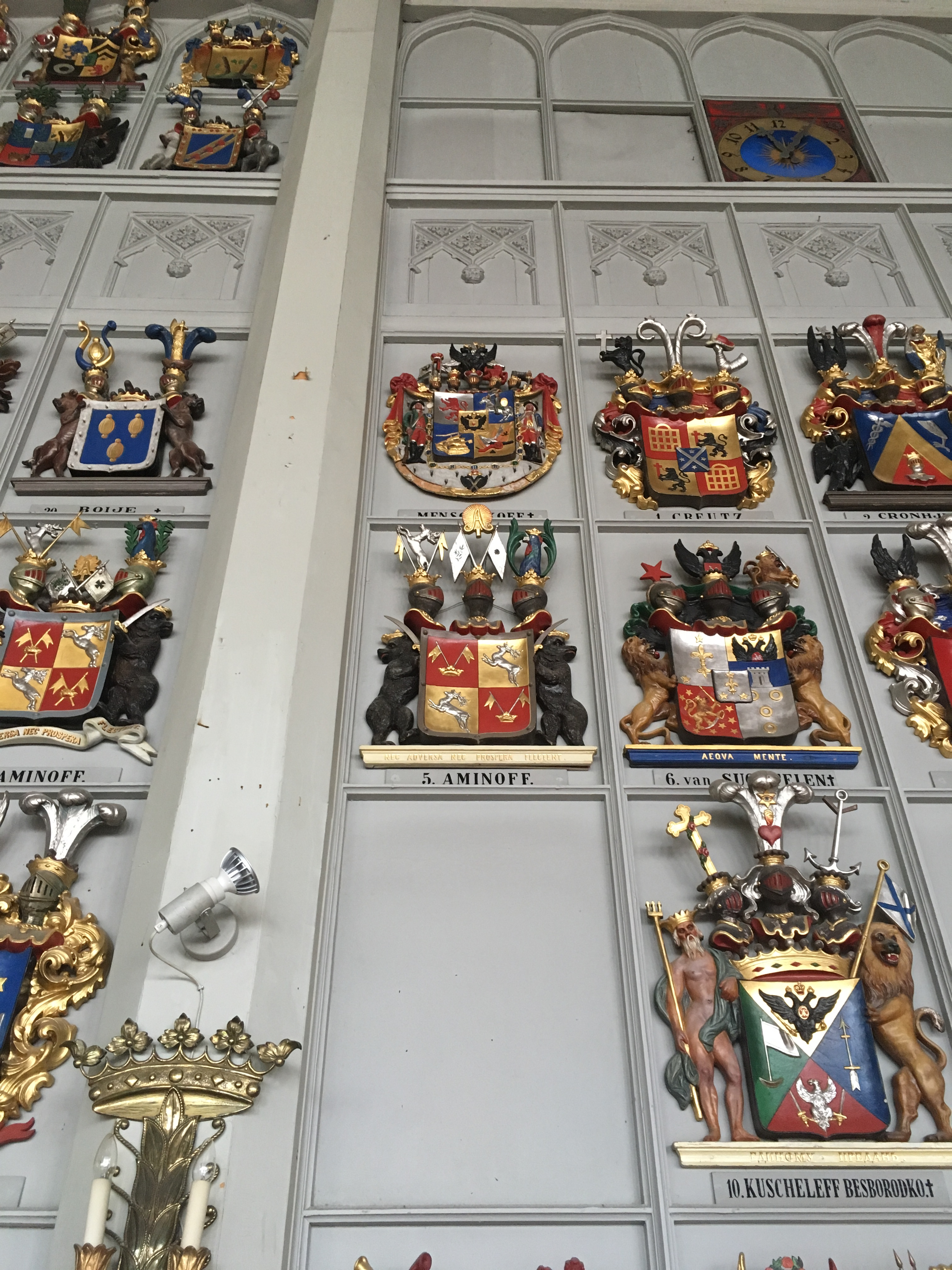
Aminoff coat of arms of the count lineage at the House of Nobility in Helsinki.

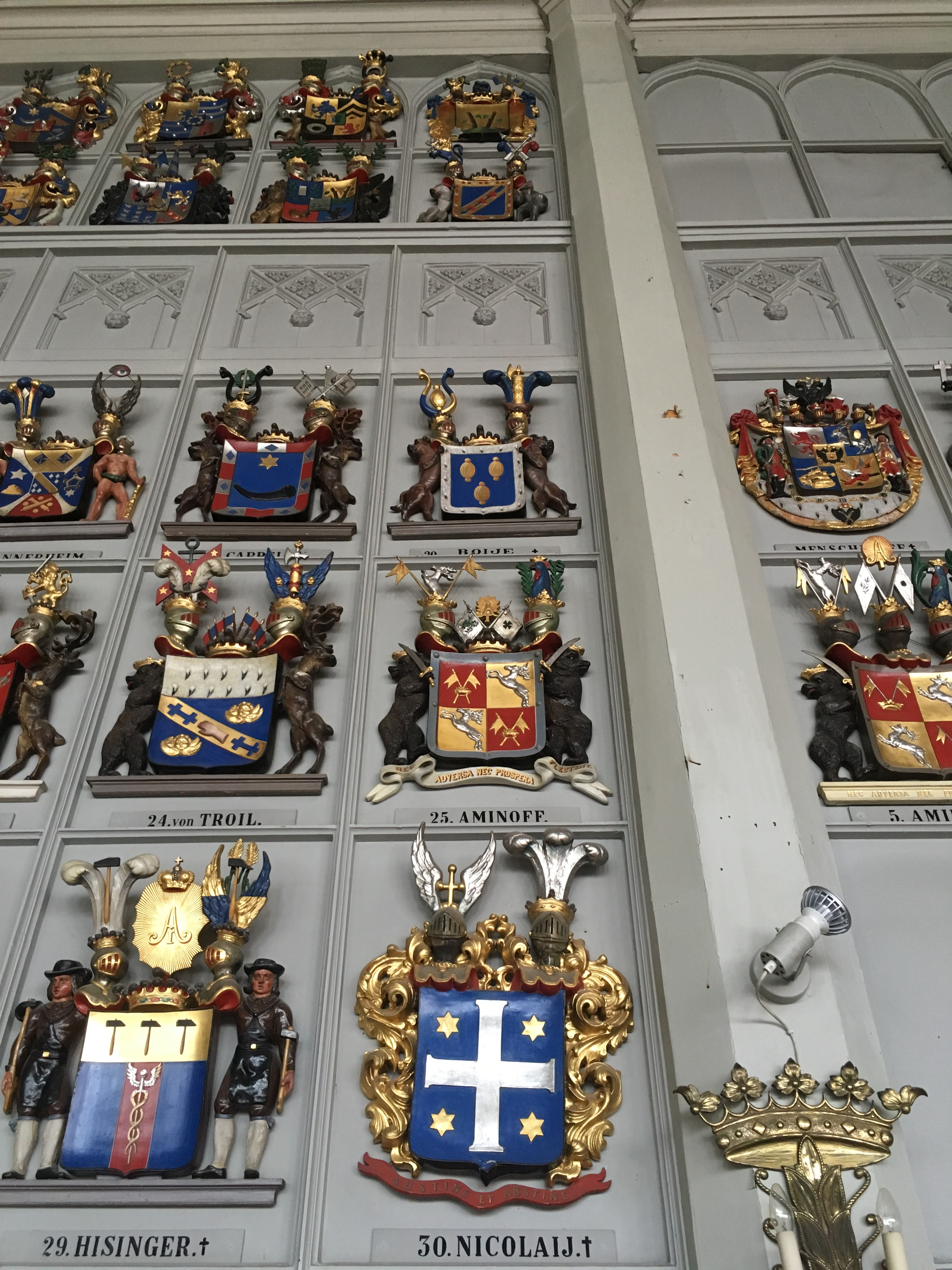
Aminoff coat of arms of the baron lineage at the House of Nobility in Helsinki.

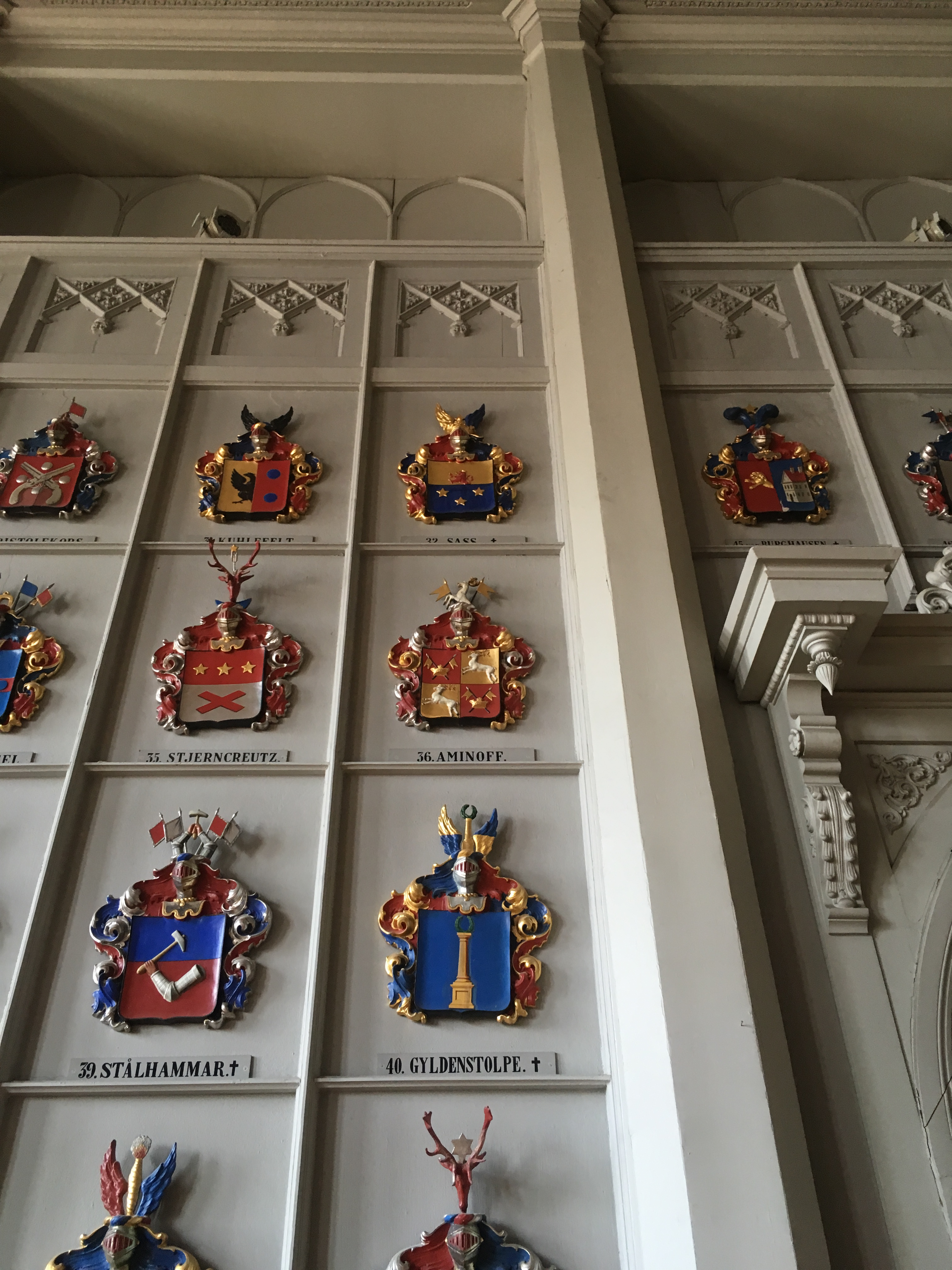
Aminoff coat of arms of the noble lineage at the House of Nobility in Helsinki.

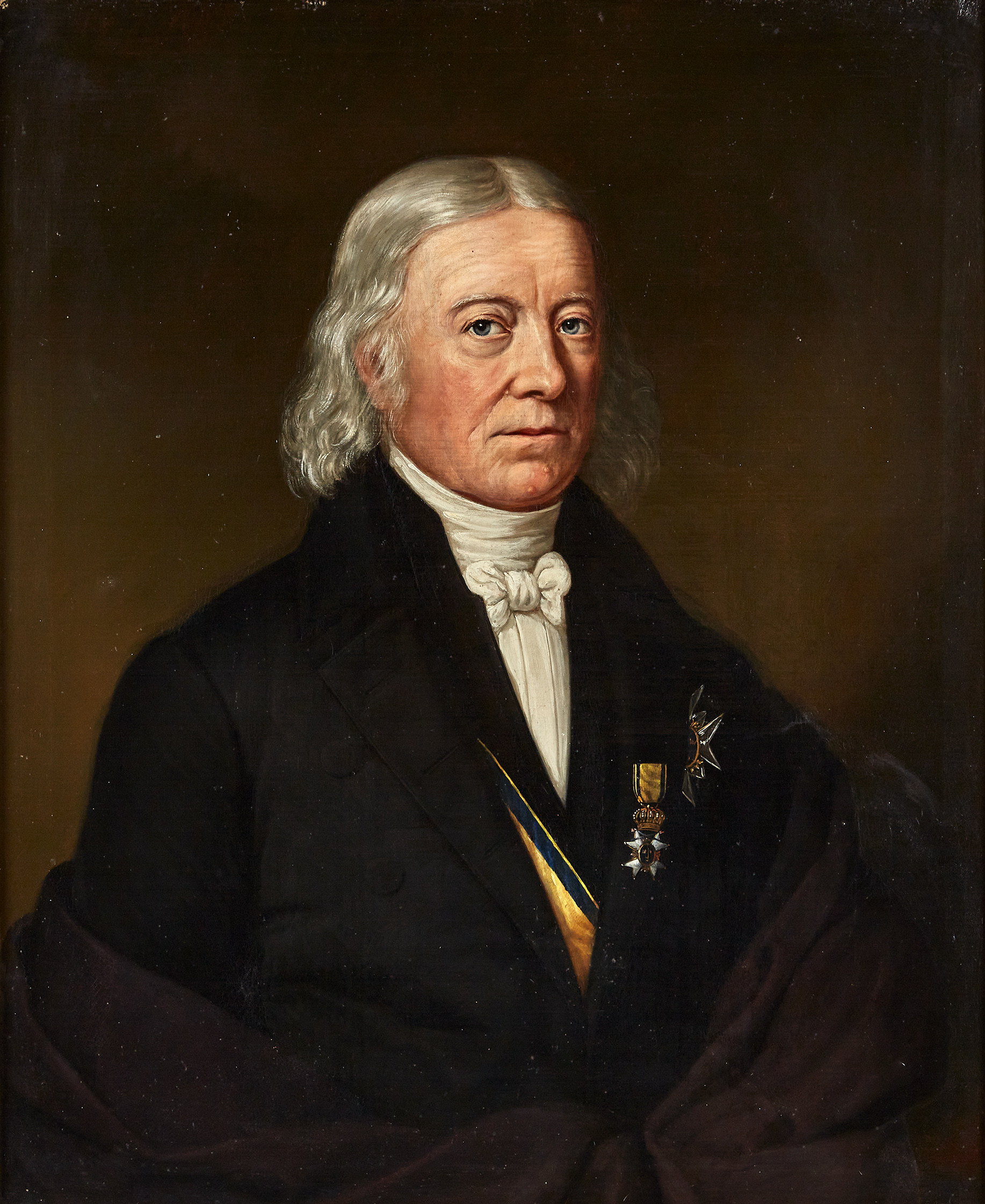
Count Johan Fredrik Aminoff.

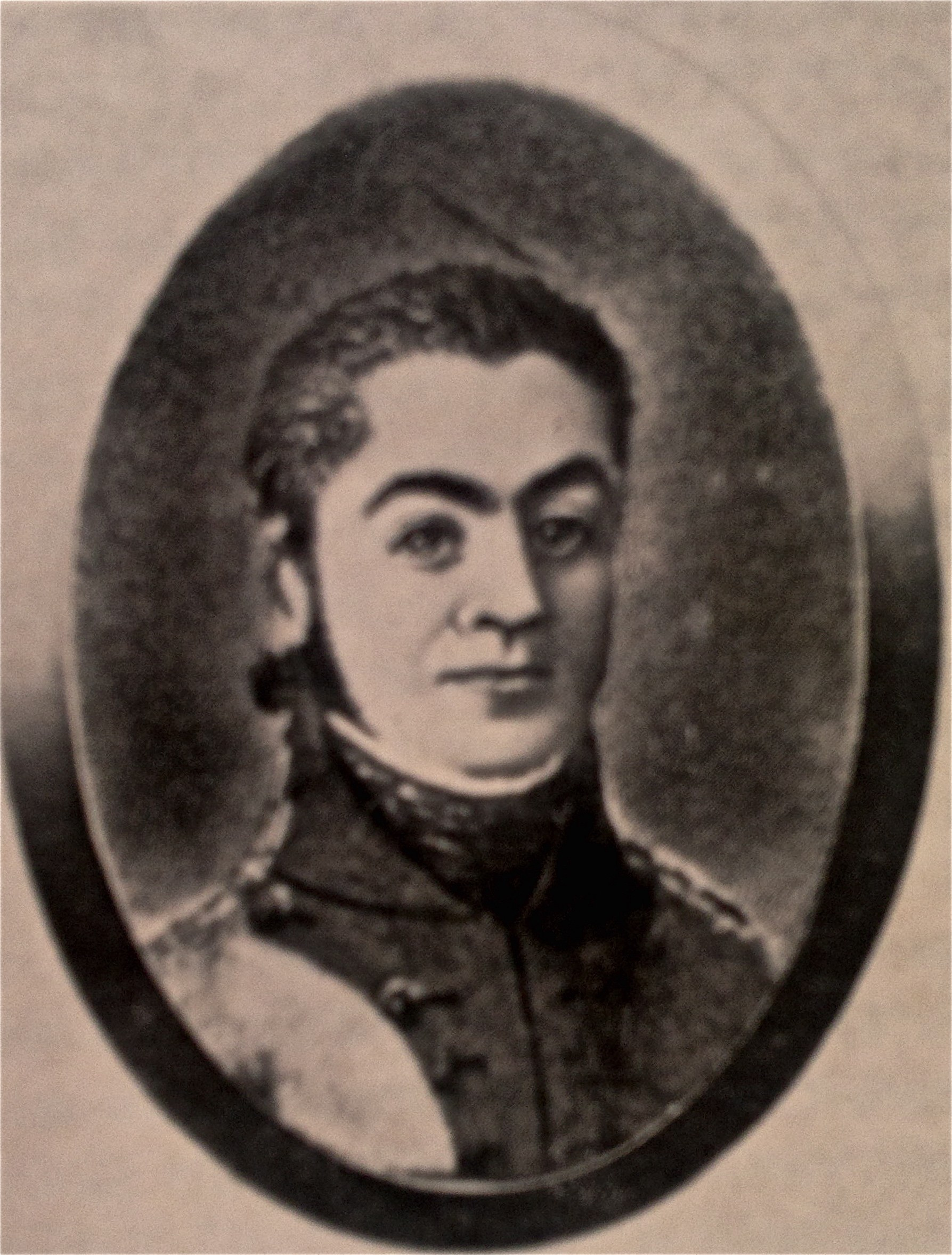
Lietenaunt Colonel Berndt Jonas Aminoff.

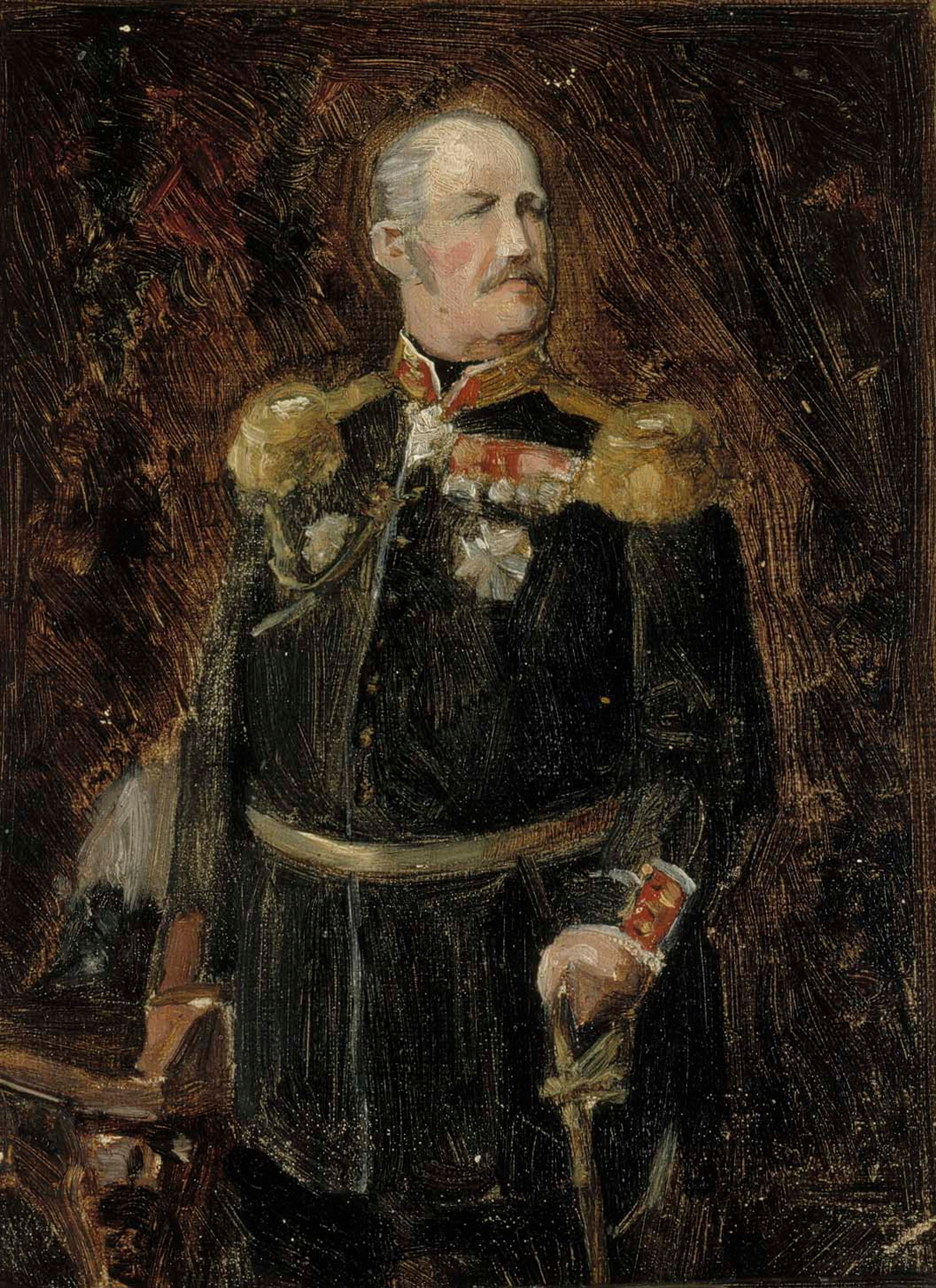
Count Adolf Aminoff.

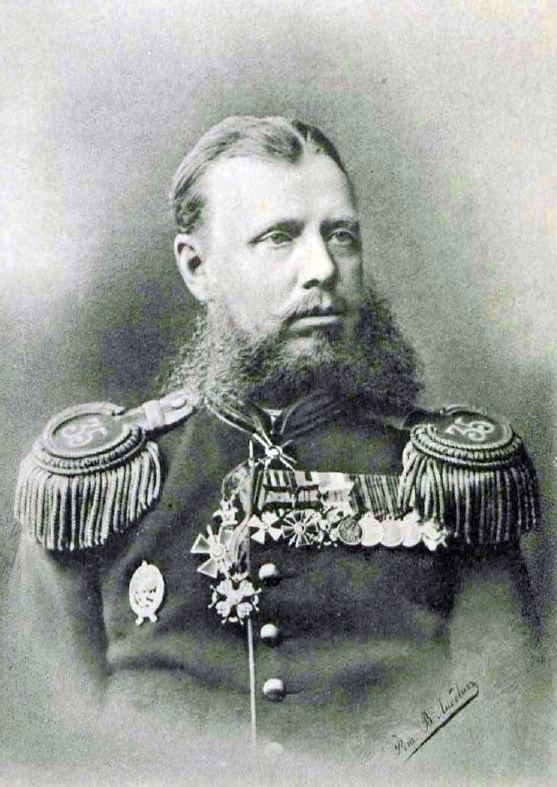
Baron, Lieutenant General Johan Fredrik Gustav Aminoff.

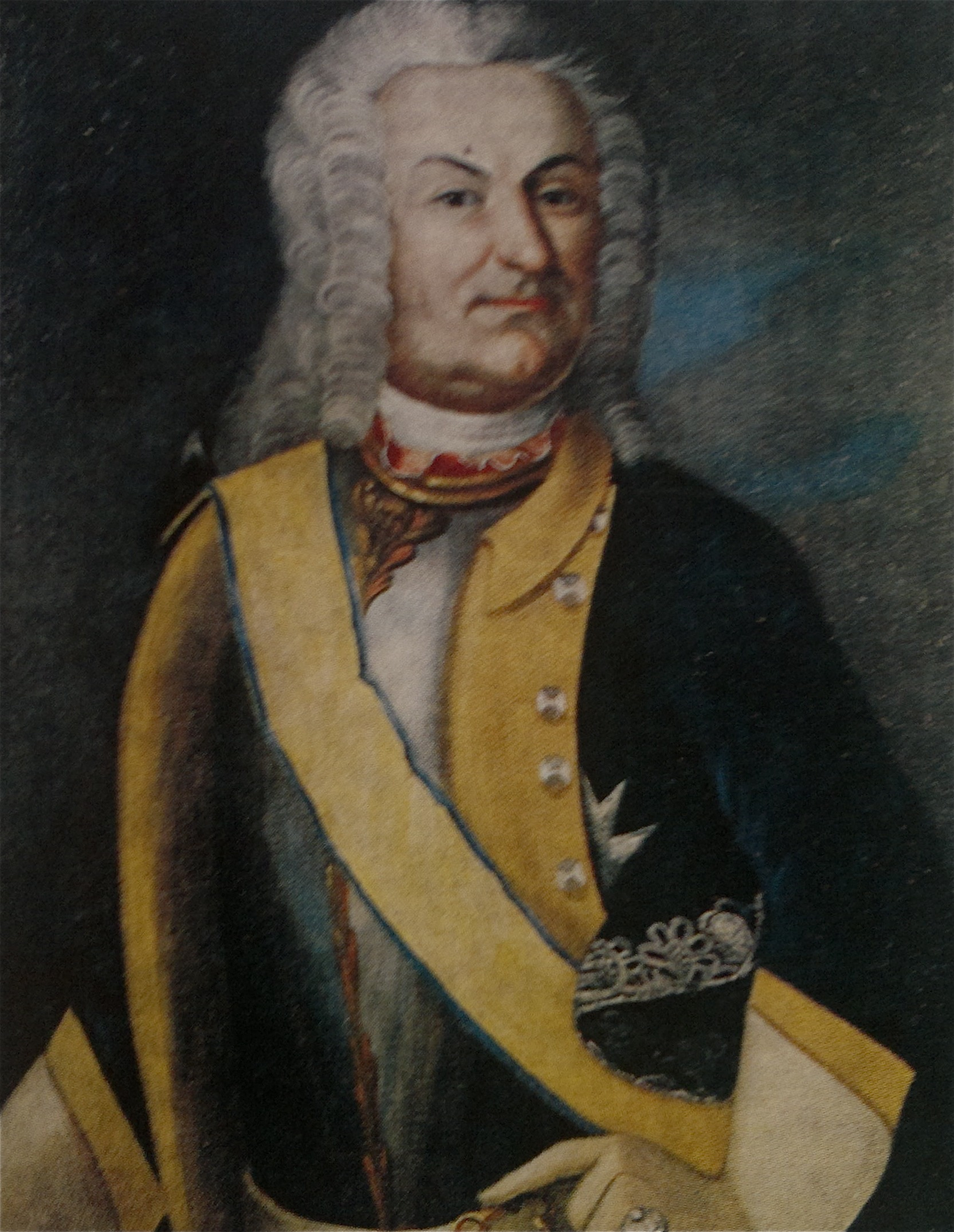
Lieutenant General Henrik Johan Aminoff.
