= Swedish Ingria =

Part of Swedish Empire (1583–95, 1617–1721)

Coordinates: 59.3758°N 28.1961°E

Swedish Ingria Svenska Ingermanland
- 1583–1595; 1617–1721
- Flag Coat of arms

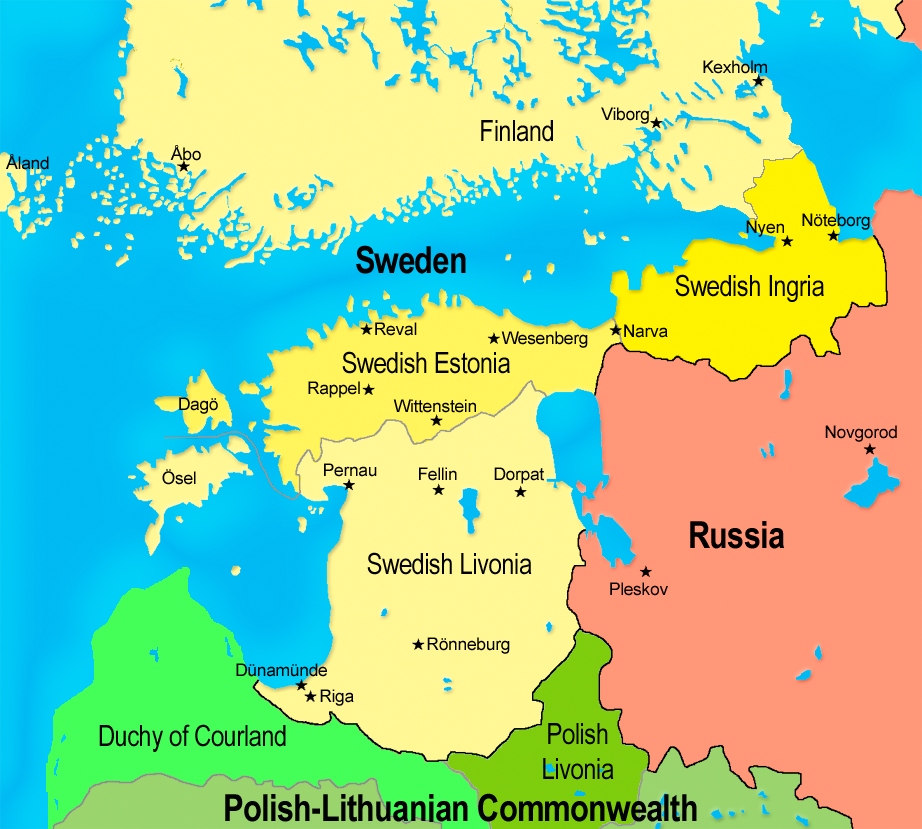
- Baltic provinces of Swedish Empire in the 17th century.
- Status: Dominion of the Swedish Empire
- Capital: Narva
- Common languages: Swedish, Finnish, Ingrian, Votian
- King of Sweden
  - 1568–92: John III
  - 1592–99: Sigismund
  - 1611–32: Gustav II Adolf
  - 1720–51: Frederick I
- Governor-General
  - 1617–: Carl Carlsson Gyllenhielm
  - 1659–1673: Simon Grundel-Helmfelt
- History
  - Conquered by Sweden: 1583
  - Ceded to Russia: 18 May 1595
  - Treaty of Stolbovo: 17 February 1617
  - Great Northern War: 1700–21
  - Conquered by Russia: 1708
  - Treaty of Nystad: 30 August 1721

Population
  - 1644: 15,000
Preceded by	Succeeded by
Tsardom of Russia	Ingermanland Governorate

Swedish Ingria (Swedish: Svenska Ingermanland, lit. 'land of Ingrians') was a dominion of the Swedish Empire from 1583 to 1595 and then again from 1617 to 1721 in what is now the territory of Russia. At the latter date, it was ceded to the Russian Empire in the Treaty of Nystad, at the end of the Great Northern War between the two empires.

== History ==
Ingria had fallen to Sweden in the 1580s and as a consequence of the Treaty of Plussa (1583), Sweden kept the Ingrian towns of Ivangorod (Ivanslott), Jamburg (Jama/Jamo) and Koporye (Kaprio) together with their hinterland. Russia only kept a narrow passage to the Baltic Sea at the estuary of the Neva River, between Strelka and Sestra Rivers. The region was returned to Russia by the Treaty of Teusina (1595), and again ceded together with the remainder of Ingria and the County of Kexholm to Sweden in the Treaty of Stolbovo (1617) that concluded the Ingrian War.

The area ran along the basin of the Neva River, between the Gulf of Finland, the Narva River, and Lake Peipus to the southwest, and Lake Ladoga to the northeast. Kexholm and Swedish Karelia were bordered by the Sestra (Rajajoki/Systerbäck) river to the northwest. Sweden's interest in the territory was strategic: as a buffer zone against Russian attacks on the Karelian Isthmus and present-day Finland; and Russian trade was to pass through Swedish territory. In addition, Ingria was used as a destination for Swedish deportees.

Ingria remained sparsely populated. In 1664 the population was counted as 15,000. Swedish attempts to introduce Lutheranism were met with repugnance by the Orthodox peasantry obliged to attend Lutheran services. Although converts were promised grants and tax reductions, Lutheran gains were chiefly due to voluntary resettlements from Savonia and Karelia. Ingria was enfeoffed to noble military and state officials, who brought their own Lutheran servants and workmen to the area. The indigenous inhabitants of Ingria have always been Finnic with Finnic culture and language.

Nyen became the trading centre of Ingria, and in 1642 was made its administrative centre. In 1656 a Russian attack badly damaged the town, and the administrative centre was moved to Narva in neighbouring Swedish Estonia.

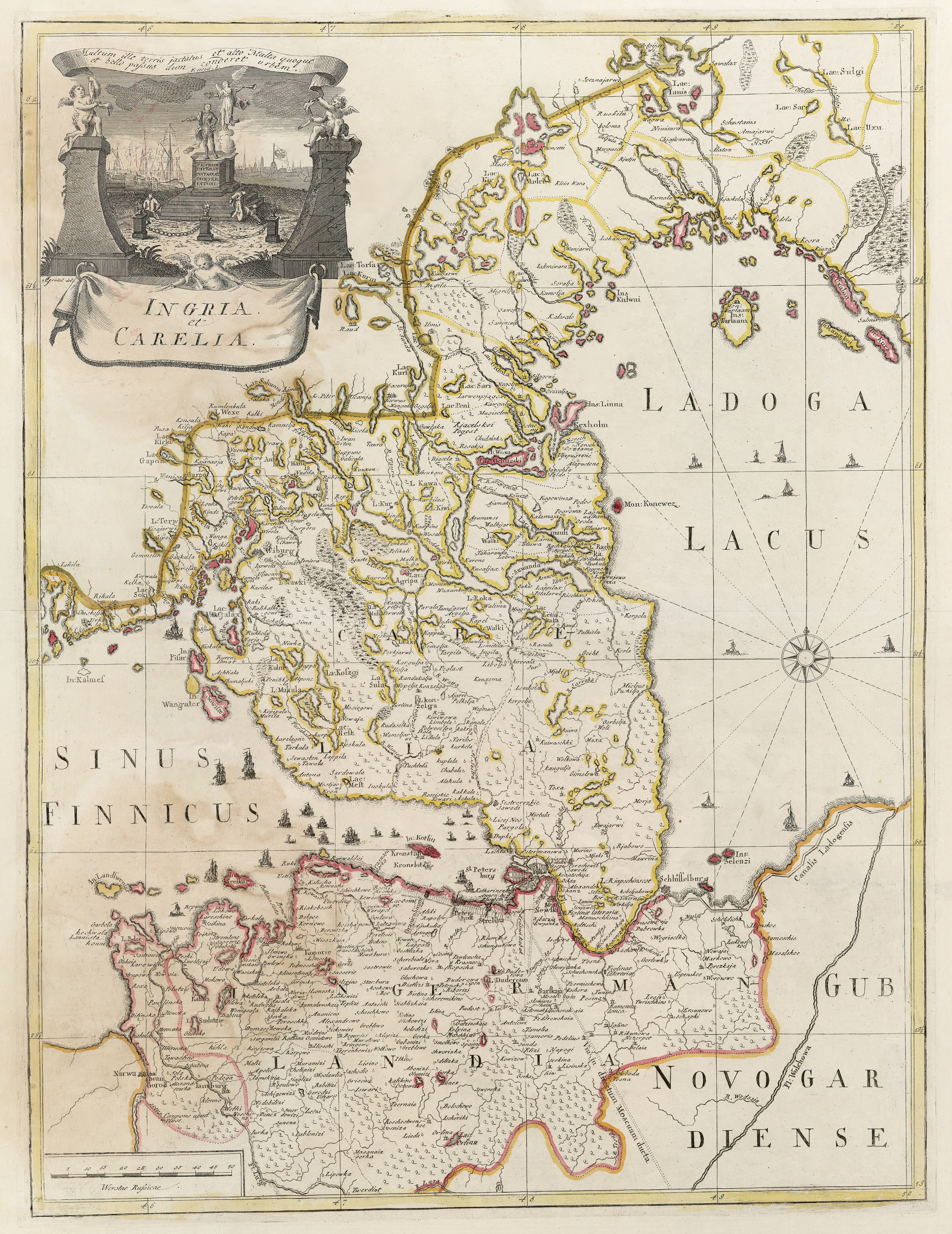
Map of Ingria and Karelia shortly after the regions were transferred to Russia in the Treaty of Nystad (1721).

The local Ingrian nobility was absorbed in the Swedish nobility and became part of a group of Swedish noble families that were later known as the Russian Bayos. During the seventeenth century, most of the bayor families were closely associated with the province of Ingria, where they were supposed to constitute a part of the ruling class that might be more acceptable to the Orthodox, to a large extent Russian, population than was the Lutheran Swedish and German nobility. Simultaneously, however, the bayors were expected to raise their sons as good Lutherans in order to retain an 'eligibility' to offices in the state and in the army. This fact led to nearly full integration into the Swedish nobility by the end of the seventeenth century, although at home, and especially among the women, Orthodoxy and syncreticism may still have been fairly widespread. The bayor families practiced endogamy to a large extent in the 17th century, which might have allowed Russian traditions to live on ‘at home’ but show increasingly less outwardly. This is to be contrasted with the state of affairs in c.1640 when almost all bayors would have regarded – and showed – themselves as Orthodox, as the elderly still did in the 1660s. Till the mid-century they frequently interceded for the protection of Orthodox institutions.

Especially in the early decades of Swedish Ingria, there were also, at a social level higher than the peasantry but below the bayors by far: the Russian townspeople of the city of Ivangorod and the townships of Jama, Caporie and Nöteborg, with some particularly well-off individuals (e.g. of the families Babin, Lebed, and Belous); the Orthodox clergy; the Russian so-called 'half' bayors, Swedish: half-baijorer; and a very small group of Tatar warriors (these last two groups soon disappear from sight.)

In the early 18th century the area was reconquered by Russia in the Great Northern War after a century under Swedish possession. The new Russian capital, Saint Petersburg, was founded in 1703 on the site of the Swedish town Nyen (Finnish Nevanlinna, meaning Castle of Neva). This territory, close to the Neva river's estuary at the Gulf of Finland, is now part of Leningrad Oblast, Russia.

== Administrative divisions ==
Swedish Ingria was divided into four counties (län), which were in turn divided into pogosts:

- Ivangorods län, 1 pogost, capital: Ivangorod (Ivanslott)
- Jama län, 3 pogosts, capital: Jama
- Koporje län, 14 pogosts, capital: Koporje
- Nöteborgs län, 8 pogosts, capital: Nöteborg

== List of governors-general ==
Stadtholder

- Samuel Nilsson till Hässle (1601–1607)
- Filip von Scheiding (1607–1613)
- Evert Karlsson Horn af Kanckas (1613–1615)
- Anders Eriksson Hästehufvud (1615–1617)

Ingrian Governors (Narva, Ivangorod, Jaama, Koporje and Nöteborg)

- Carl Carlsson Gyllenhielm (1617–1620)
- Henrik Klasson Fleming (1620–1622)
- Anders Eriksson Hästehufvud (1622–1626)
- Nils Assersson Mannersköld (1626–1629)
- Heinrich Matthias von Thurn (1629)

Ingrian and Livonian Governors-General

- Johan Skytte (1629–1634)
- Bengt Bengtsson Oxenstierna (1634–1643)

Ingrian and county of Kexholm Governors-General

- Erik Carlsson Gyllenstierna (1642–1645)
- Carl Mörner (1645–1651)
- Erik Stenbock (1651–1654)
- Gustaf Evertsson Horn (1654–1657)
- Krister Klasson Horn af Åminne (1657–1659)
- Simon Grundel-Helmfelt (1659–1664)
- Jacob Johan Taube (Kudina mõisast) (1664–1668)
- Simon Grundel-Helmfelt (1668–1673)
- Jacob Johan Taube (1673–1678)
- Gustaf Adam Banér (1678)
- Jacob Johan Taube (1678–1681)

Ingrian Governors

- Martin Schultz von Ascheraden (1681–1682)
- Hans von Fersen the older (1682–1683)
- Göran von Sperling (1683–1687)

Ingrian Governors-General

- Göran von Sperling (1687–1691)
- Otto Wilhelm von Fersen (1691–1698)
- Otto Vellingk (1698–1703)

== See also ==
- dominium maris baltici
- Nöteborg Fortress
- Nyenschantz
- Ingria
