= Russian bayors =

Group of Russian noble families in Swedish service

Bayors (Swedish: baijorer [baˈjǔːrɛr] or ryss(e)baijorer, Russian bayors), were a group of Russian noble families who had entered Swedish service in the late 16th–early 17th centuries and were incorporated into the Swedish nobility. The word is derived from Russian Russian: бояринъ, romanized: bojarin 'boyar' and in the Swedish language of the early modern era it referred to all Russian noblemen.

Of these, the most notable were the families:

- Rosladin (Розладинъ)
  Swedish coats-of-arms of the immatriculated bayor families except the Baranoffs (the dates refer to the immatriculation at the Riddarhus, not to the beginning of their Swedish service, which in several cases took place much earlier)
- Baranoff (Барановъ/Борановъ)
- Aminoff (Аминевъ, branches later re-introduced in Russia as Аминовъ)
- Kalitin/Callentin (Калитинъ)
- Butterlin (Бутурлинъ, Buturlin)
- Zebotaioff/Sabotaioff (Чеботаевъ, not Зебетриевъ etc.), one branch later known as Apolloff (Опалёвъ, not Аполловъ etc.)
- Pereswetoff-Morath (Пересвѣтовъ (-Муратъ, not Моратъ))
- Clementeoff (Клементьевъ)
- Nassokin (Насакинъ, not Нащокинъ)
- Golawitz (Головачевъ)
- Rubzoff (Рубцовъ; originally not a noble family but of Smolensk posadskie liudi),

which were all immatriculated ('introduced') at the Swedish House of Nobility (for their immatriculation numbers, see the List of Swedish noble families). In 1818, those families resident east of the Bothnian were similarly immatriculated at the Finnish House of Nobility, then in the Russian Grand Duchy of Finland (compare the List of Finnish noble families). The coats-of-arms granted by the kings of Sweden almost invariably allude to military prowess and tend to include weaponry which was regarded as 'Muscovite' (sabres, bows and arrows, maces; sometimes ‘tamed’ or ‘Swedicised’ by the crown within which they are crossed), mounted warriors and ‘northern’ animals. Of particular importance as a model, was the coat-of-arms of the Aminoffs.

During the seventeenth century, most of the bayor families were closely associated with the province of Ingria, where they were supposed to constitute a part of the ruling class that might be more acceptable to the Orthodox, to a large extent Russian, population than was the Lutheran Swedish and German nobility. Simultaneously, however, the bayors were expected to raise their sons as good Lutherans in order to retain an 'eligibility' to offices in the state and in the army. This fact led to nearly full integration into the Swedish nobility by the end of the seventeenth century, although at home, and especially among the women, Orthodoxy and syncreticism may still have been fairly widespread. The bayor families practiced endogamy to a large extent in the 17th century, which might have allowed Russian traditions to live on ‘at home’ but show increasingly less outwardly. This is to be contrasted with the state of affairs in c. 1640 when almost all bayors would have regarded – and showed – themselves as Orthodox, as the elderly still did in the 1660s. Till the mid-century they frequently interceded for the protection of Orthodox institutions. The French Ingrian family Barohn, several of whose members spoke Russian and were used as interpreters, was occasionally added to the group on a par with the ‘true’ bayors.

Especially in the early decades of Swedish Ingria, there were also, at a social level higher than the peasantry but below the bayors by far: the Russian townspeople of the city of Ivangorod and the townships of Jama, Caporie and Nöteborg, with some particularly well-off individuals (e.g. of the families Babin, Lebed, and Belous); the Orthodox clergy; the Russian so-called 'half' bayors, Swedish: half-baijorer; and a very small group of Tatar warriors. (The last two groups soon disappear from sight.)

A measure of their integration with Sweden may be had from a glance at the considerable number of officers from the bayor families who fought in the Swedish armies during the Great Northern War (1700–1721), mainly on the Baltic front Notice that the Nassokins and Baranoffs derived from an earlier, pre-Ingrian, layer of bayors and had for all practical purposes lost their Russian cultural identity, living, as they did, in Livonia and Finland; the Swedish Rosladins, the Butterlins and the Zebotaioffs of the name were already extinct on the male line at the time. The officers were:

- Corporal in the Drabant corps Adam Johan Aminoff, † 1702 Klissow
- Captain, later Major, Carl Johan Aminoff
- Captain of the Guard Christoffer Henrik Aminoff, † 1709 Poltava
- Lieutenant, later Major, Detlof Fredrik Aminoff, prisoner Perevolochna 1709
- Captain, later Major, Esaias Aminoff, prisoner Perevolochna 1709
- Lieutenant, later Captain, Georg Aminoff, prisoner Viborg 1710
- Captain, later Lieutenant-Colonel, Gregori Aminoff, prisoner Perevolochna 1709
- Ensign, later Captain, Gregori Aminoff
- Lieutenant, later General-in-Chief in Finland, Henrik Johan Aminoff (1680–1758), prisoner while carrying message from Lesnaya to the king 1708
- Colonel Joachim Aminoff
- Captain, later Major, Johan Aminoff, prisoner Dünamünde 1710
- Drabant Peter Aminoff
- Captain, later Lieutenant-Colonel, Stephan Gustaf Aminoff, prisoner Narva 1704. Died a Russian prisoner 1742 after again having been made POW 1741 at Villmanstrand.
- Commandant of Viborg, Colonel Zacharias Aminoff, † 1710 Viborg.
- Captain, later Major, Gregori Apolloff,
- Ensign Herman Reinhold Apolloff, † 1710 in the plague.
- Commandant of Nyenskans, Colonel Johan Apolloff, prisoner in Narva 1704, † 1706 in Russia
- Lieutenant Magnus Johan Apolloff, † 1704 Narva
- Ensign Reinhold Gustaf Apolloff, prisoner 1713 Tönning
- Commandant at Caporie, Captain Wasili Apolloff, † 1709 Viborg[?]
- Ensign Zacharias Fredrik Apolloff, prisoner 1710 Viborg
- Lieutenant Carl Fredrik Baranoff
- Lieutenant Detlof Johan Baranoff
- Captain Fredrik Baranoff
- Lieutenant Georg Christoffer Baranoff
- Lieutenant, later Major, Georg Johan Baranoff, prisoner Perevolochna 1709
- Lieutenant Gotthard Fredrik Baranoff, prisoner 1708 Lesnaya, returned (escaped?) 1709, † 1718 during the campaign in Norway
- Captain Johan Baranoff
- Lieutenant Magnus Reinhold Baranoff, prisoner Narva 1704, † 1715 in Russia.
- Lieutenant Casimir Johan Clementeoff, prisoner 1702 Poritz in Ingria
- Captain Fredrik Clementeoff
- Captain Wollmar Fredrik Clementeoff, prisoner Viborg 1710
- Ensign Lorentz Kalitin
- Captain, later Lieutenant-Colonel, Magnus Fredrik Kalitin, prisoner Narva 1704.
- Aid-de-champ, later Drabant and Major, Simon Adolf Kalitin, prisoner Perevolochna 1709.
- Ensign Casimir Kalitin, † 1700 Ivangorod.
- Lieutenant, later Captain, Daniel Kalitin, prisoner Viborg 1710
- Ensign Adam Johan Nassokin, took leave 1701
- Ensign Axel Gotthard Nassokin, † 1700 Narva.
- Ensign Carl Fromhold Nassokin
- Captain Carl Fromhold Nassokin
- Captain Claes Johan Nassokin, † 1709 Poltava
- Captain at the Admiralty Georg Henrik Nassokin
- Lieutenant Gotthard Nassokin, d. 1712
- Captain, later Major, Magnus Henrik Nassokin, prisoner Perevolochna 1709
- Captain Magnus Johan Nassokin, took leave for old age 1703
- Ensign Nils Nassokin, † 1702 Hummelshof
- Lieutenant Peter Nassokin, prisoner Perevolochna 1709
- Lieutenant, later Captain, Peter Johan Nassokin, prisoner Jakobstadt 1704
- Lieutenant-Colonel Alexander Pereswetoff-Morath, † 1709 Viborg
- Captain, later Major, Alexander Pereswetoff-Morath, prisoner Narva 1704, escaped 1712; made a knight of the Order of the Sword for bravery in the battle of Villmanstrand 1741
- Colonel, later Major-General, Carl Pereswetoff-Morath, prisoner Narva 1704
- Lieutenant, later Lieutenant-Colonel Carl Gustaf Pereswetoff-Morath; made a knight of the Order of the Sword for bravery in the battle of Villmanstrand 1741
- Major Gustaf Pereswetoff-Morath, † 1704 Narva
- [The Lieutenant Jurgen ‘Morath’/‘Morast’ fatally wounded at Narva 1700 appears not to have been a Pereswetoff-Morath despite frequent claims to the contrary.]
- Captain, later Major, Alexander Rubzoff, prisoner Poltava 1709
- Lieutenant, later Captain, Carl Gustaf Rubzoff, prisoner Narva 1704

In several cases on the Baltic front, more than one bayor descendant might be found in the same detachment. Thus in the cavalry regiment of Colonel Carl Pereswetoff-Morath in Ingria we find the Captain Stephan Aminoff, the Lieutenant Carl Gustaf Rubzoff, and a Corporal Alexander Pereswetoff-Morath along with Major von Rohr, an Ingrian nobleman of German parentage.

Among families which, for one reason or other, are not as regularly counted among the bayors we find the Homutoffs (Хомутовъ), the Carpofskis (Карповскiй), and the Luhmenoffs (Лугмѣновъ). The first two would doubtless have been among the most central ones had they not been extinguished on the male line before immatriculation. Several individual noblemen who had no issue or who were soon repatriated to Russia could be similarly referred to as ‘bayors’ in the 17th century.

At the present time, there seem to be living representatives only of the Aminoffs and the Pereswetoff-Moraths (and possibly, although apparently no longer in Scandinavia, the Kalitins).

== See also ==
- List of Swedish noble families
- Swedish nobility
- Russian nobility
