= Shah =

Royal title of Persian origin

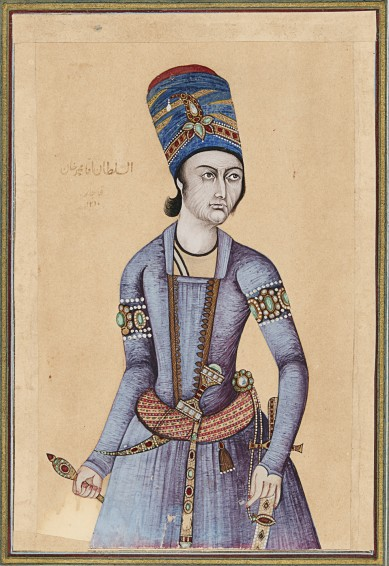
Agha Mohammad Shah Qajar, the founder of the Qajar dynasty. The Qajar dynasty ruled Iran until being overthrown by the Pahlavi dynasty.

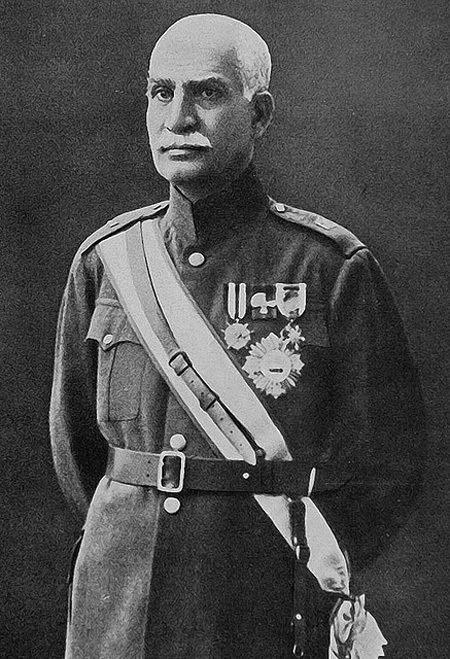
Reza Shah Pahlavi Founder of the Pahlavi Dynasty in 1940.

Shāh (/ʃɑː/; Persian: شاه [ʃɒːh]) is a royal title meaning 'king' in Persian. Though chiefly associated with the monarchs of Iran, it was also used to refer to the leaders of numerous Persianate societies and non-Islamic kingdoms, such as the Ottoman Empire, the Khanate of Bukhara and the Emirate of Bukhara, the Mughal Empire, the Maratha Empire, the Bengal Sultanate, and various Afghan dynasties, as well as among Gurkhas. With regard to Iranian history, in particular, each ruling monarch was not seen simply as the head of the concurrent dynasty and state, but as the successor to a long line of royalty beginning with the original Persian Empire of Cyrus the Great. To this end, he was more emphatically known as the Shāhanshāh (شاهنشاه, šāhanšāh, 'king of kings' [ˌʃaːhanˈʃaːɦ]) since the Achaemenid dynasty. A roughly equivalent title is Pādishāh (پادشاه, pādišāh, pādšāh, 'master king'), which was most widespread during the Muslim period in the Indian subcontinent.

== Etymology ==
The word descends from Old Persian xšāyaθiya 'king', which used to be considered a borrowing from Median as it was compared to Avestan xšaθra-, 'power' and 'command', corresponding to Sanskrit kṣatra- (same meaning), from which kṣatriya-, 'warrior', is derived. Most recently, the form xšāyaθiya has been analyzed as a genuine, inherited Persian formation with the meaning 'pertaining to reigning, ruling'. This formation with the 'origin' suffix -iya is derived from a deverbal abstract noun *xšāy-aθa- 'rule, ruling, Herrschaft', from the (Old Persian) verb xšāy- 'to rule, reign'. The full, Old Persian title of the Achaemenid rulers of the First Persian Empire was Xšāyaθiya Xšāyaθiyānām or (Middle Persian) Šâhân Šâh, 'King of Kings' or 'Emperor'. This title has ancient Near Eastern or Mesopotamian precedents. The earliest attestation of such a title dates back to the Middle Assyrian period as šar šarrāni, in reference to the Assyrian ruler Tukulti-Ninurta I (1243–1207 BC).

== History ==
=== Persian dynasties ===
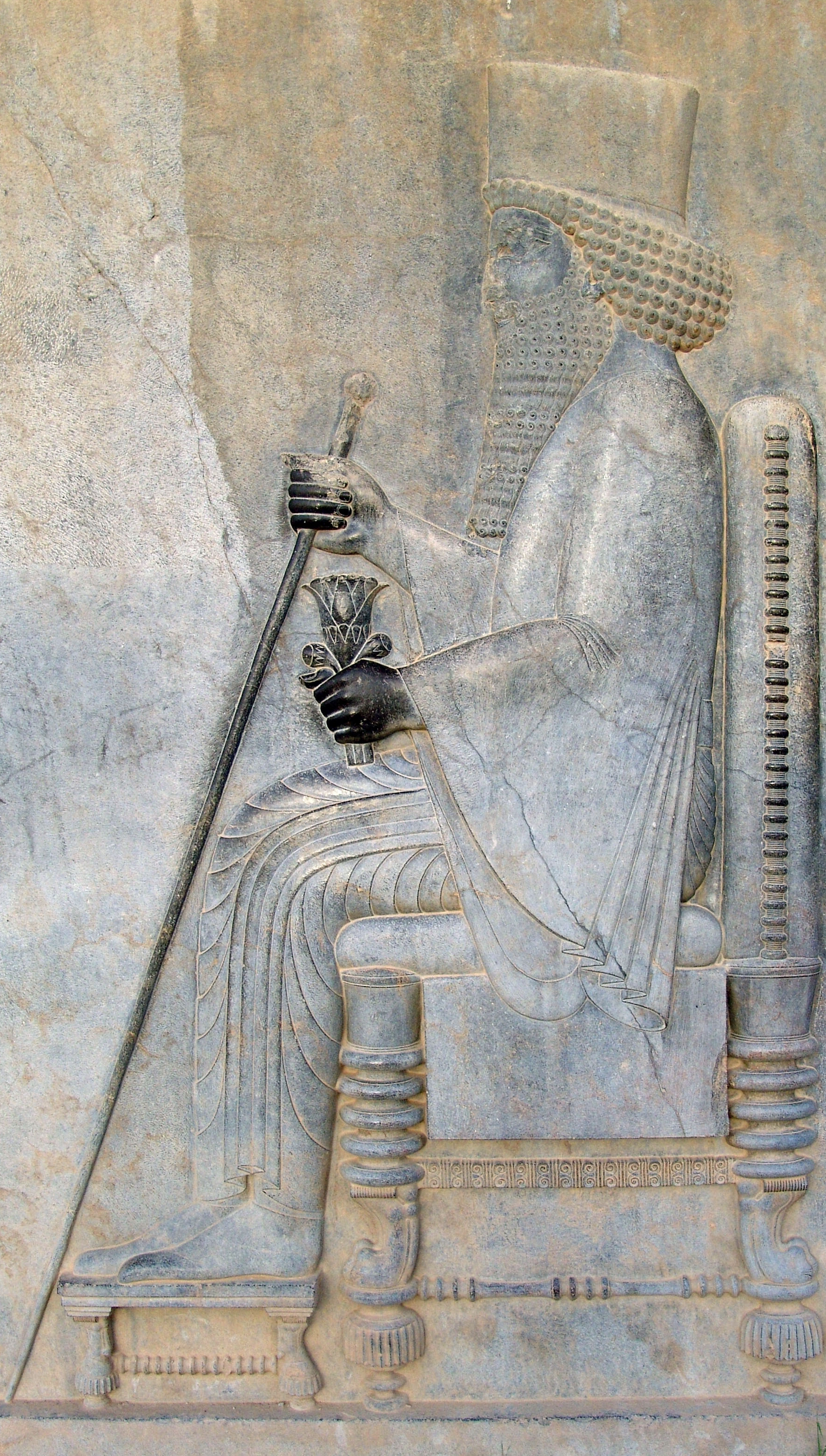
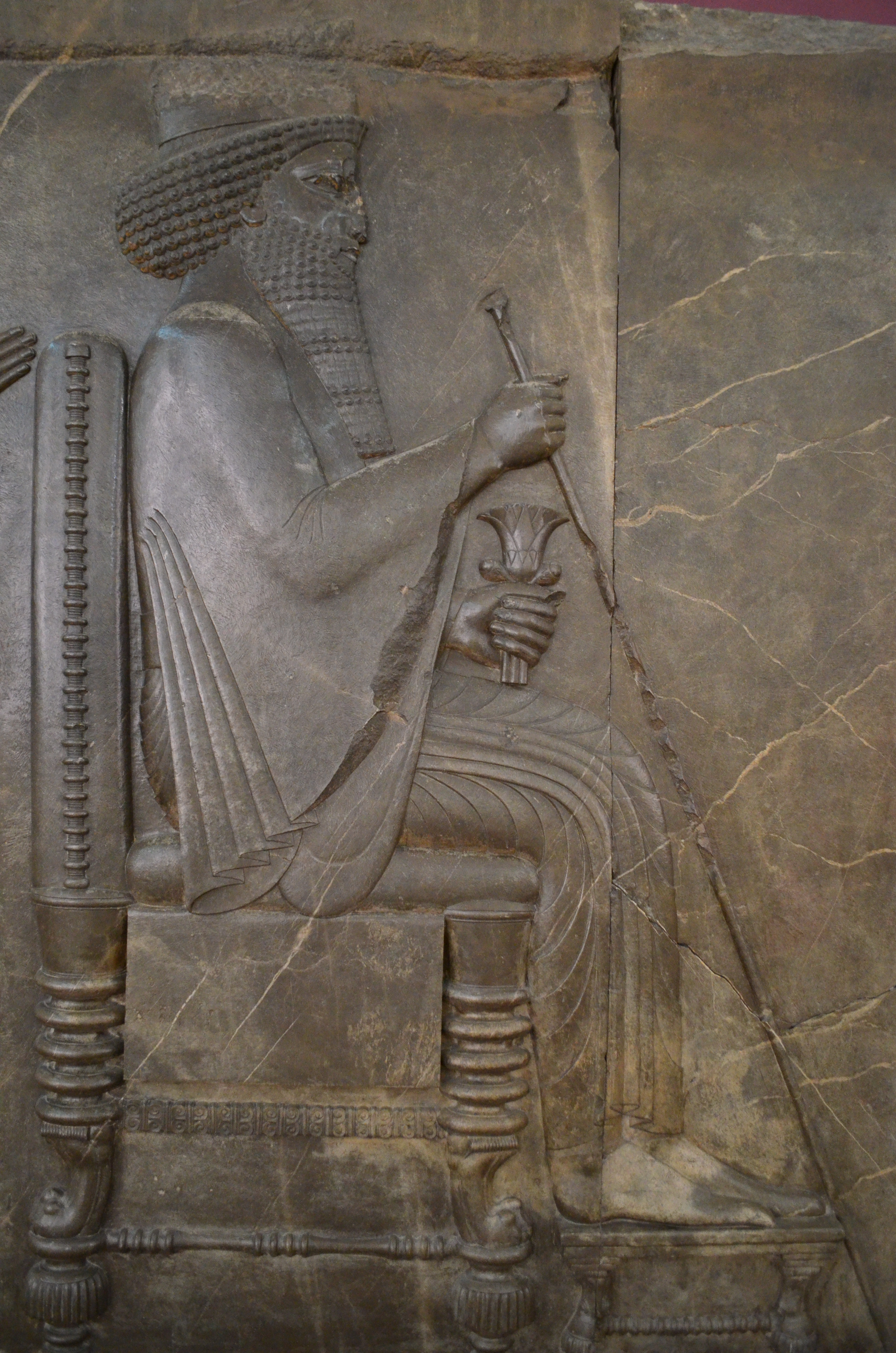
Historically, the title "King of Kings" (Shāhanshāh) is most prominently associated with Darius the Great (top figure) and Xerxes the Great (bottom figure), among other Persian monarchs of the Achaemenid dynasty.

Shāh, also known by its full-length term Shāhanshāh (King of Kings), was the title of the Persian emperors. It includes rulers of the first Persian Empire, the Achaemenid dynasty, who unified Persia in the sixth century BC, and created a vast intercontinental empire, as well as rulers of succeeding dynasties throughout history until the 20th century and the Imperial House of Pahlavi. While in Western sources the Ottoman monarch is most often referred to as a Sultan, in Ottoman territory he was most often referred to as Padishah and several used the title Shah in their tughras. Their male offspring received the title of Şehzade, or prince (literally, "offspring of the Shah", from Persian shahzadeh).

The full title of the Achaemenid rulers was Xšāyaθiya Xšāyaθiyānām, literally "King of Kings" in Old Persian, corresponding to Middle Persian Šâhân Šâh, and Modern Persian شاهنشاه (Šâhanšâh). In Greek, this phrase was translated as βασιλεὺς τῶν βασιλέων (basileus tōn basiléōn), "King of Kings", equivalent to "Emperor". Both terms were often shortened to their roots shah and basileus.

In Western languages, Shah is often used as an imprecise rendering of Šāhanšāh. For a long time, Europeans thought of Shah as a particular royal title rather than an imperial one, although the monarchs of Persia regarded themselves as emperors of the Persian Empire (later the Empire of Iran). The European opinion changed in the Napoleonic era, when Persia was an ally of the Western powers eager to make the Ottoman Sultan release his hold on various (mainly Christian) European parts of the Ottoman Empire, and western (Christian) emperors had obtained the Ottoman acknowledgement that their western imperial styles were to be rendered in Turkish as padishah.

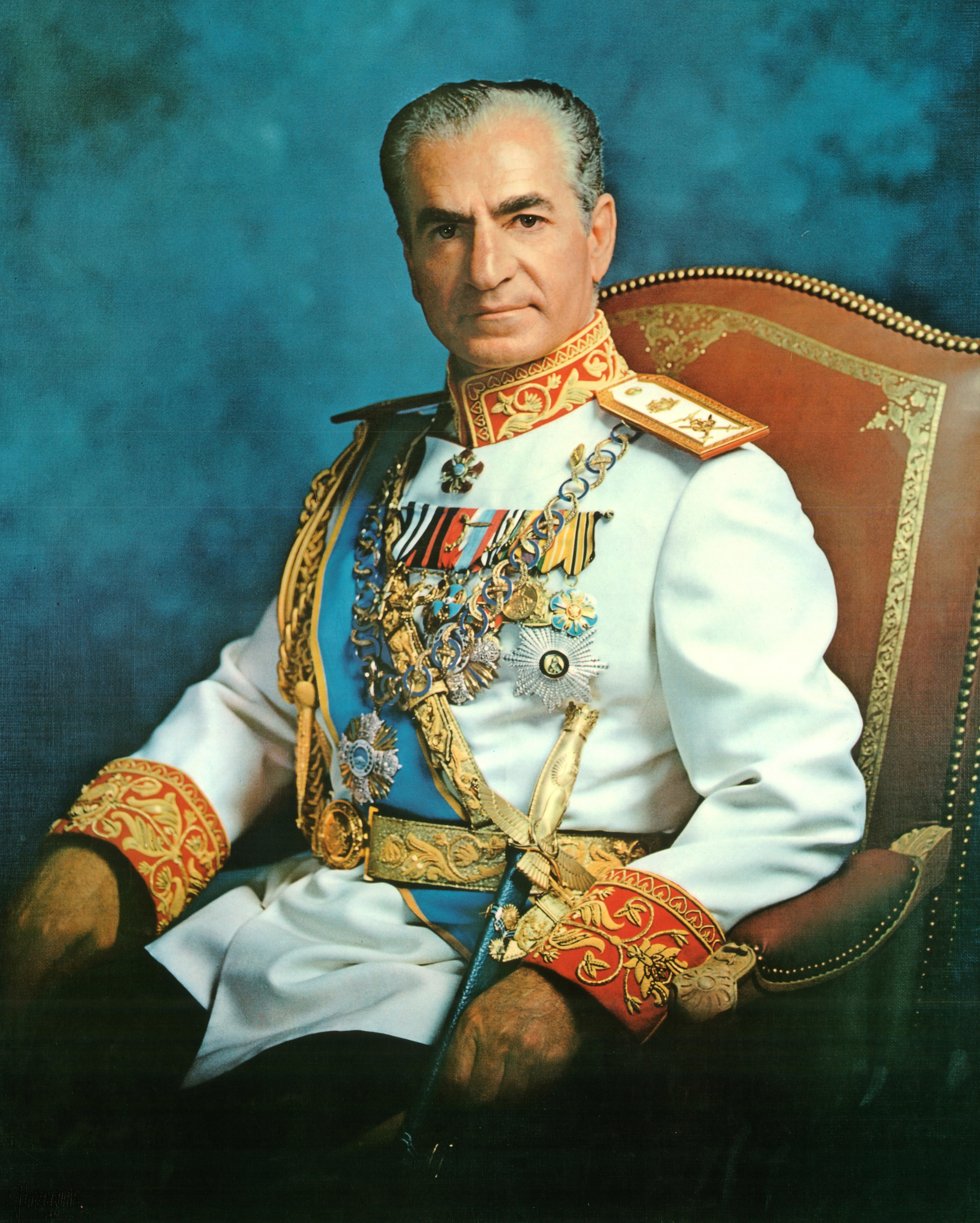
Mohammad Reza Shah Pahlavi.

In the twentieth century, the Shah of Persia, Mohammad Reza Pahlavi, officially adopted the title شاهنشاه Šâhanšâh and, in western languages, the rendering Emperor. He also styled his wife شهبانو Shahbânū ("Empress"). Mohammad Reza Pahlavi was the last Shah, as the Iranian monarchy was abolished after the 1979 Iranian Revolution.

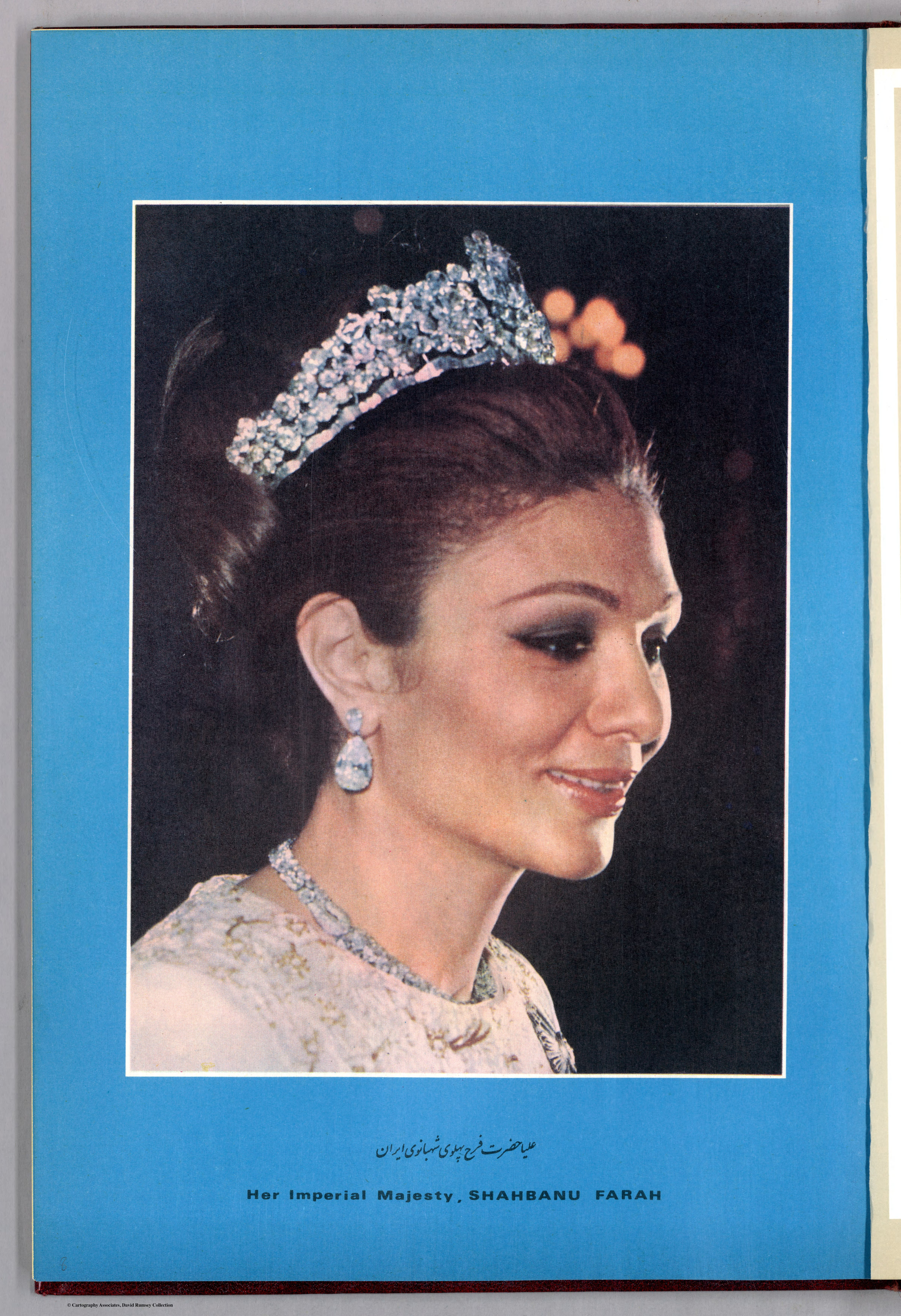
1972 portrait of Farah Pahlavi, describing her as Shahbanu Farah

=== Non-Persian dynasties ===
- From the reign of Ashot II, the Bagratid kings of Armenia used the title shahanshah, meaning "king of kings".
- The title Padishah (Great King) was adopted from the Iranians by the Ottomans and by various other monarchs claiming imperial rank, such as the Mughals that established their dynasty in the Indian subcontinent.
- Another subsidiary style of the Ottoman and Mughal rulers was Shah-i Alam Panah (Persian: شاه عالم پناه), meaning "the king that is the refuge of the world."
- The Shah-Armens ("Kings of Armenia", sometimes known as Ahlahshahs), used the title Shāh-i Arman (lit. 'Shah of Armenians').
- Some monarchs were known by a contraction of the kingdom's name with shah, such as Khwarezmshah, ruler of the realm of Khwarezmia in the Central Asia, or the Shirvanshah of the historical region of Shirvan in Caucasia (present-day Republic of Azerbaijan)
- The kings of Georgia called themselves shahanshah alongside their other titles. The Georgian title mepetmepe (also meaning King of Kings [Mepe-king in Georgian]) was also inspired by the shahanshah title.

== Impact and influence ==
=== Derived terms ===
==== Shahzada ====
Shahzada (Persian: شاهزاده, romanized: šāhzāda, lit. 'royal/imperial descendant', also transliterated as Šâhzâde). In the realm of a shah (or a loftier derived ruler style), a prince or princess of the royal blood was logically called shahzada as the term is derived from shah using the Persian patronymic suffix -zāda or -zâde, "born from" or "descendant of". However the precise full styles can differ in the court traditions of each shah's kingdom. This title was given to the princes of the Ottoman Empire (Şehzade, Ottoman Turkish: شهزاده) and was used by the princes of Islamic India (Śahzāda, Urdu: شہزادہ, Bengali: শাহজাদা, romanized: Shahzada) such as in the Mughal Empire. The Mughals and the Sultans of Delhi were of Indo-Persian and Turco-Mongol origin, a continuation of traditions and habits ever since Persian language was first introduced into the region by Turco-Persian dynasties centuries earlier.

Thus, in Oudh, only sons of the sovereign shah bahadur (see above) were by birth-right styled "Shahzada [personal title] Mirza [personal name] Bahadur", though this style could also be extended to individual grandsons and even further relatives. Other male descendants of the sovereign in the male line were merely styled "Mirza [personal name]" or "[personal name] Mirza". This could even apply to non-Muslim dynasties. For example, the younger sons of the ruling Sikh maharaja of Punjab were styled "Shahzada [personal name] Singh Bahadur".

The borrowing shahajada, "Shah's son", taken from the Mughal title Shahzada, was the usual princely title borne by the grandsons and male descendants of a Nepalese sovereign in the male line of the Shah dynasty until its abolition in 2008.

For the heir to a "Persian-style" shah's royal throne, more specific titles were used, containing the key element Wali al-Ahd, usually in addition to shahzada, where his junior siblings enjoyed this style.

==== Others ====
- Shahbanu (Persian شهبانو, Šahbânū): Persian term using the word shah and the Persian suffix -banu ("lady"): Empress, in modern times, the official title of Empress Farah Pahlavi.
- Shahpur (Persian شاهپور Šâhpur) also been derived from shah using the archaic Persian suffix -pur "son, male descendant", to address the Prince.
- Shahdokht (Persian شاهدخت Šâhdoxt) is also another term derived from shah using the Persian patronymic suffix -dokht "daughter, female descendant", to address the Princess of the imperial households.
- Shahzade (Persian شاهزاده Šâhzâde): Persian termination for prince (lit; offspring of the Shah); used by Ottoman Turks in the form Şehzade.
- Malek ol-Moluk (Persian: ملک الملوک) "king of kings", an Arabic title used by the Iranian Buyids, a Persianized form of the Abbasid amir al-umara

=== Related terms ===
- Satrap, the term in Western languages for a governor of a Persian province, is a distortion of xšaθrapāvan, literally "guardian of the realm", which derives from the word xšaθra, an Old Persian word meaning "realm, province" and related etymologically to shah.
- Deeply revered among both the Hindus and some Muslims in India, 1st Guru of Sikhism Guru Nanak was referred to as 'Shah' by the Muslims and as' Faqir' by the Hindus, the highest honour in both the religions, and hence came to known as "Nanak Shah Faqir".
- Maq'ad-a-Šâh (Persian: مقعد شاه Maq'ad-a-Šâh), the phrase from which the name of Mogadishu is believed to be derived, which means "seat of the Shah", a reflection of the city's early Persian influence.
- The English word "checkmate" is in fact derived from "shah-mat" (from Persian via Arabic, Latin and French). Related terms such as "chess" and "exchequer" likewise originate from the Persian word, their modern senses having developed from the original meaning of the king piece.

=== Armenian names ===
Armenian compound personal names often contain the element "šah," meaning "king" in Middle Persian and New Persian. These names can be found in both masculine and feminine forms and may include native Armenian or foreign components. The element "šah" can appear as either the first or second component and is sometimes part of doublet forms with the components reversed. For example, masculine names include Šah-amir and Amir-šah, Šah-paron and Paron-šah, and Vahram-šah; feminine names include Šah-xat‘un and Xat‘un-šah, and Šah-tikin.

Some examples of these compound names include masculine Šah-aziz and feminine Aziz-šah, masculine Sult‘an-šah and feminine Šah-sult‘an, and masculine Melik‘-šah and feminine Šah-melē/ik‘. These names, particularly the feminine forms, sometimes vary in gender depending on the source.

The name Artamšin, for instance, is based on *Artam from Old Iranian *R̥tāma-, interpreted as "having power of/from R̥ta." The auslaut of the Armenian name suggests a connection to the Iranian word for "king," šāh, found in various languages including Middle Persian and New Persian.

In another example, the name Šaštʻi is interpreted as "Šah-Lady," with the second component reflecting the Arabic term sittī, meaning "My lady, lady." This name is found in a colophon from the Kołbay monastery as the name of a sister of Dawitʻ and priest Vardan.

Overall, Armenian compound names containing the element "šah" provide insight into the linguistic and cultural interactions between Armenian and Iranian languages and cultures.

== See also ==
- Shah (surname)
- Ikhshid
- Mirmiran
