= Pereswetoff-Morath =

Pereswetoff-Morath (Swedish pronunciation: [pɛrɛˈsvěːtɔf mʊˈrɑːt]; Russian: Пересветов-Мурат or just Пересветов) is a Swedish noble family of Russian origin, one of the so-called bayor families. Varyingly traced to the Blessed Alexander Peresvet of Radonezh (died 1380) and to a certain Vasiliy Ivanovich Peresvet in early-15th-century Dmitrov (NW of Moscow), the family, in the person of Murat Alekseyevich Peresvetov (died 1640) from Rostov Velikij, entered Swedish service in 1613-14 during the Ingrian War. Throughout the 17th century, family members were mainly active in the Swedish province of Ingria, near the Russian border. Immatriculated in 1652 at the Swedish House of Nobility (Riddarhuset), it remained for three centuries a family of officers and lawyers. In 1919, on the death of Carl Fredrik Pereswetoff-Morath, the unbroken male line was discontinued. However, Carl Fredrik had an adopted son, Carl-Magnus (1896–1975), the biological son of Magnus Dahlqvist (d. 1895) and Ida Pereswetoff-Morath in their marriage, and thus second (and third) cousin once removed of his adoptive father. All living family members are descendants of lieutenant-colonel Carl-Magnus Pereswetoff-Morath; the surviving line is not represented at the House of Nobility. Among notable members are Colonel Alexander Pereswetoff-Morath (originally Alexander Moraht Pereswetoff, d. 1687), commandant of Nyenskans (Ingria), and his son, General Carl Pereswetoff-Morath, 1665–1736, active with his two brothers on the Baltic front in the Great Northern War (prisoner of war in Moscow 1704–21). Among the descendants of lieutenant-colonel Carl-Magnus Pereswetoff-Morath are the former general secretary of the Swedish Civil Defence Association, Magnus Pereswetoff-Morath (b. 1921), and the Slavist, Professor Alexander Pereswetoff-Morath (b. 1969).

The 16th-century Muscovite publicist Ivan Semyonovich Peresvetov has been believed to have belonged to another, west Russian, family. However, the historian Andrei Kuzmin recently made a case for regarding these as branches of one family.

== See also ==
- List of Swedish noble families
- Russian bayors
