= Mirmiran =

Military title of the Ottoman Pasha

Mirmiran (Turkish: Mirmiran) was the military title of the Ottoman Pasha, similar to the title of Beylerbey, the ruler of the Eyalet. Initially, the title was assigned to two pashas: the ruler of Kyustendil (the Mirmiran of Rumelia) and the ruler of Erzurum (the Mirmiran of Anatolia). However, then the number of title holders increased to 20. The phrase "mir-mir-an" itself means "commandant over commandants".

== See also ==
- Battle of Velbazhd
- History of Kyustendil
