= Axel Klingenstierna =

Swedish military strategist (1875–1966)

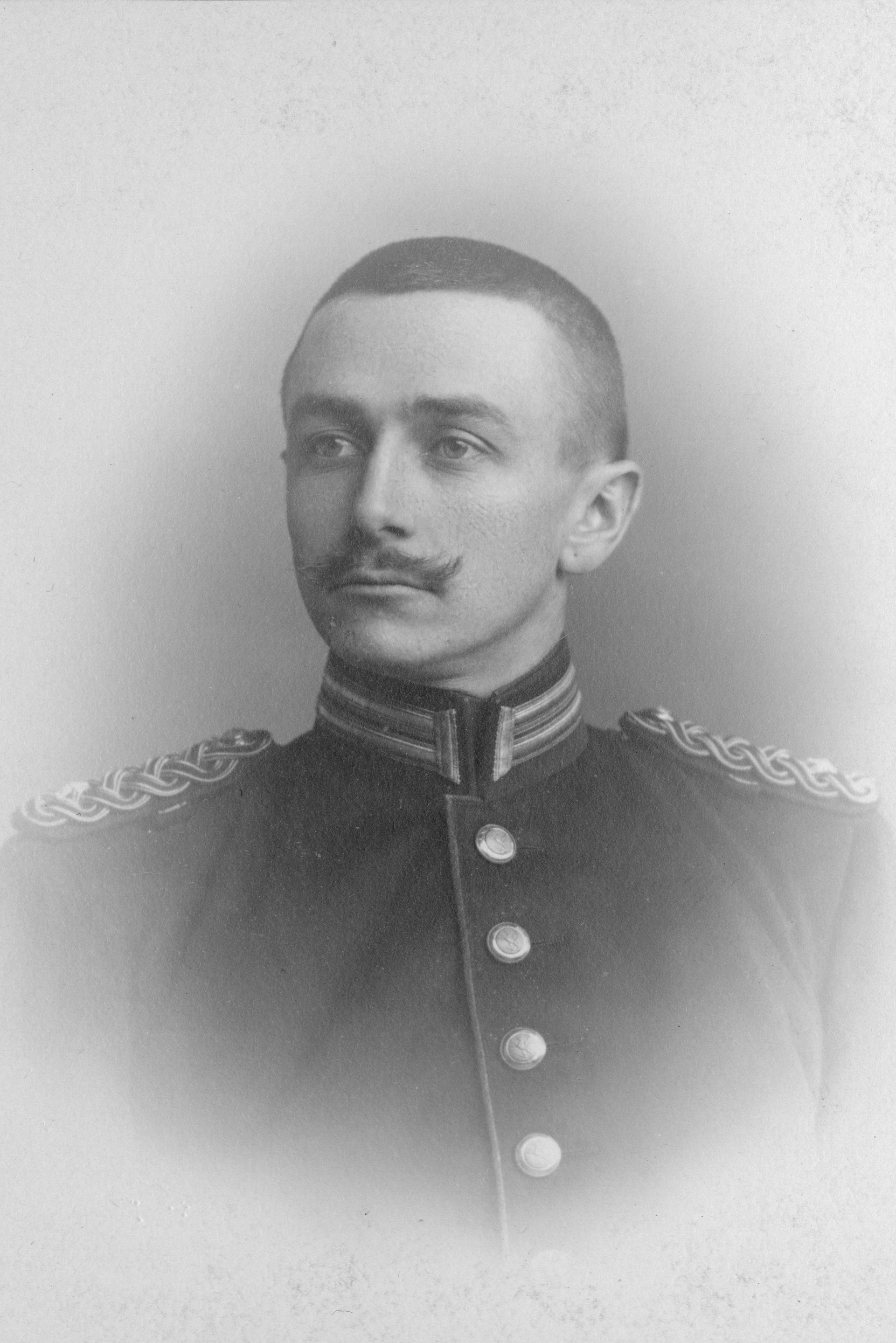

Personal details
- Born: July 7, 1875 Kila, Södermanland County, Sweden–Norway
- Died: December 21, 1966 (aged 91) Karlstad, Värmland County, Sweden
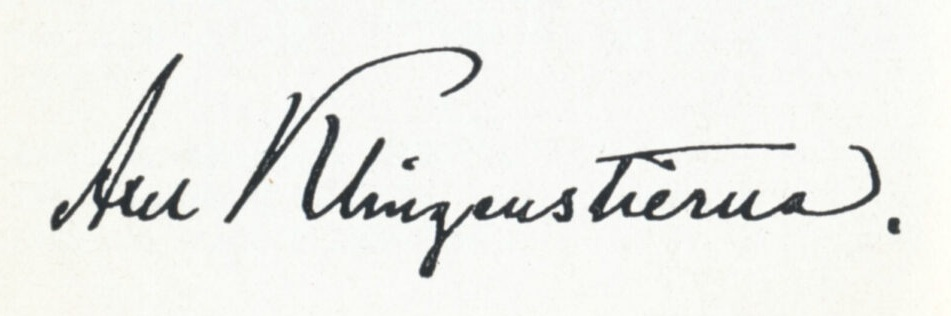
- Signature

Military service
- Branch/service: Swedish Army
- Years of service: 1896–1940
- Rank: Generalmajor

Claës Axel Klingenstierna (Swedish pronunciation: [ˈǎksɛl ˈklɪŋɛnˌɧæːɳa] 1875–1966) was a Swedish Army staff officer. He was a member of the Klingenstierna clan.

== Biography ==
Axel Klingenstierna was born in the village of Kila in Södermanland.

In 1896, he was commissioned as an underlöjtnant in the Södermanland Regiment. In the late 1890s, he studied in Montpellier, Dresden, and Moscow among other places. In 1902, he completed a course at the Royal Swedish Army Staff College.

During the Russo-Japanese War, Klingenstierna and Nils D. Edlund led Swedish efforts to secretly support Japan with military intelligence and met with Col. Akashi Motojirō, spymaster for the Daihon'ei in Europe. Among other things, Klingenstierna and Iwan T. Aminoff were able to set up an espionage network inside Russia in order to collect intelligence for the Japanese.

In 1906, he became a lieutenant in the General Staff.

Between 1928 and 1931, Klingenstierna served on an anti-aircraft research committee. In 1935, he was promoted to generalmajor and transferred to the reserve. Klingenstierna wrote numerous essays and received patents for a number of inventions.

Klingenstierna died in 1966.
