= Anders Eriksson Hästehufvud =

Swedish noble

governor of Riga
- In office 1628–1648

Personal details
- Born: 14 September 1577 Bolstad Parish
- Died: 5 May 1657 (aged 79)
- Occupation: civil servant

Military service
- Unit: Västergötland Cavalry Regiment
- Battles/wars: Kalmar War

Anders Eriksson Hästehufvud (14 September 1577 – 5 May 1657) was a Swedish civil servant and officer who served as Governor of the Duchy of Estonia between 1617 and 1619 and Governor-General of Swedish Livonia in 1628.

== Biography ==
Eriksson Hästehufvud was born 14 September 1577 in Bolstad Parish in Dalsland, where his father was a vicar. In 1600 he took up service with Anders Lennartsson. In 1602 he became a referendary in the chancellery of Charles IX and in the following years he had several civilian administrative positions.

Following the outbreak of the Kalmar War in 1611, Eriksson Hästehufvud joined the army, fought with success under Jesper Mattson Cruus and in 1612 was appointed ryttmästare (captain) in the Västergötland Cavalry Regiment. He took part in the siege of Novgorod in 1614 and in 1615 he was named commandant of Narva by Gustaf II Adolf, who simultaneously elevated him to the nobility (he was formally introduced into the Swedish nobility in 1627).

Eriksson Hästehufvud served as commandant at Ivangorod, Jama (1617–1620) and Mitau (1621–1622). Following his brave defence of Mitau against eight months of Polish attacks, he was appointed commandant-general of Narva, Ivangorod, Jama, Koporje and Nöteborg in 1622.

After having served as vice admiral in the Swedish Navy in 1626, he became governor of Marienburg in 1625. In 1628 he became governor of Riga, where he stayed until his resignation in 1648. In 1655 Charles X Gustav named him a member of the College of Reduction, an office instituted to oversee the reduction decided by the crown that year.
