= Nils D. Edlund =

Swedish Army officer (1867–1930)

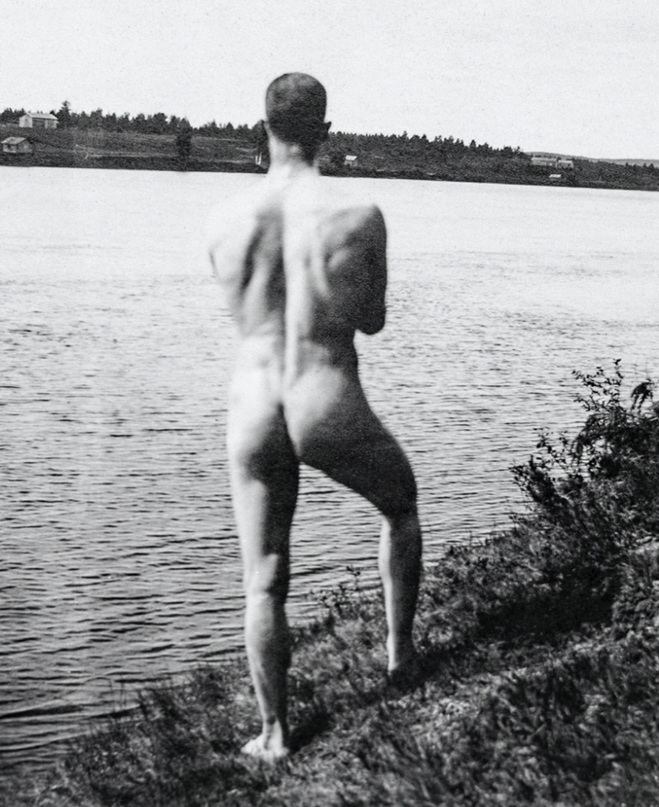

Personal details
- Born: March 6, 1867 Stora Mellösa, Sweden–Norway
- Died: May 5, 1930 (aged 63) Sweden

Military service
- Branch/service: Swedish Army
- Years of service: 1885–1922

Nils David Edlund (1867–1930) was a Swedish Army officer, archaeologist, and adventurer.

== Biography ==
Edlund joined the Västerbotten Regiment as a volunteer in 1885. Between 1892 and 1894, Edlund studied the Russian language at the Royal Swedish Army Staff College.

During the Russo-Japanese War, Edlund was involved in Swedish efforts to secretly support Japan with military intelligence. Edlund cooperated with Axel Klingenstierna and Iwan T. Aminoff to collect information from inside Russia which was transferred to Col. Akashi Motojirō.

During the Russian Civil War, Edlund and Gustaf Hallström attempted to organize a regiment of Swedish volunteers to fight against the Bolsheviks in the Baltics. In February 1919, Edlund was arrested at the Port of Liepāja by Latvian customs officials. Also arrested were Heinrich von Stryk and retired German Army officer Karl Stock. In their possession were found documents which apparently revealed a plan to overthrow the pro-Russian puppet government of Pēteris Stučka and thereby enable a takeover by Baltic Germans. Edlund quickly escaped from prison and returned home to Sweden. He retired from the army in 1922.

Starting in 1924, Edlund cooperated with archaeologist Arthur Nordén to survey ancient hillforts and stone alignments in Östergötland. Edlund and Nordén's research received substantial funding from the KVHAA. The topographic charts, photographs, and other documents prepared by Edlund were purchased by the Swedish state in 1932.
