= History of Kyustendil =

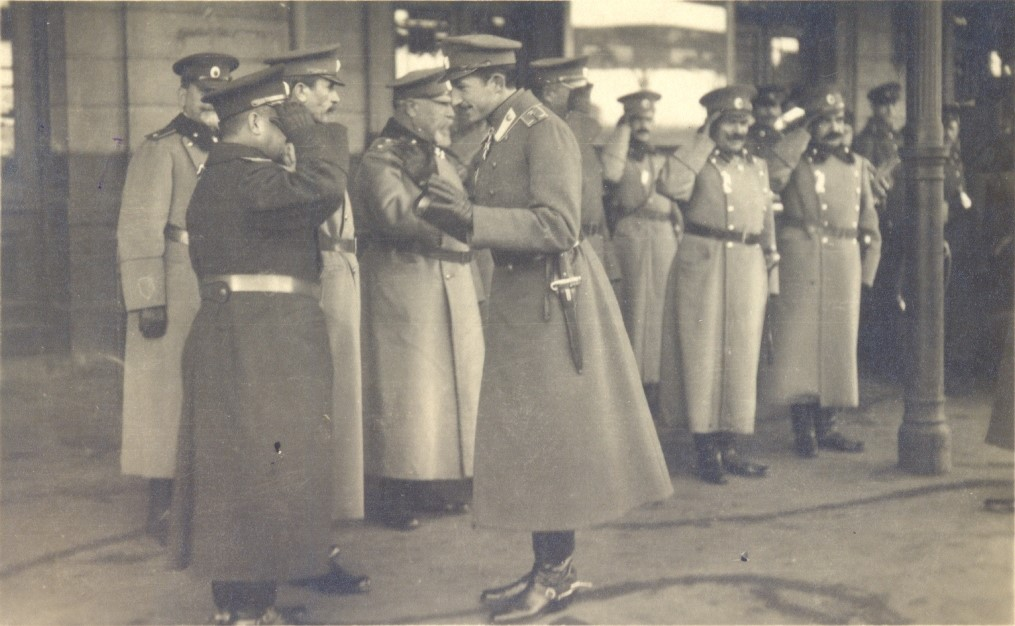
Boris III of Bulgaria, Hristo Lukov, Nikola Zhekov and Georgi Todorov at the Kyustendil railway station, 1918

The history of Kyustendil as a settlement goes back 8000 years and as a city for 2009.

It is divided into ancient, medieval and new.

The city is known mostly for Konstantin Dragash, whose name it bears. Constantine Dragash was the grandfather of the last Roman emperor (Constantine XI Dragases Palaiologos) and at the same time the great-great-grandfather of the first Russian tsar (Ivan the Terrible).

Kyustendil is also known in military history for the Battle of Velbazhd. In Ottoman times the city was the Ottoman military capital in Europe, and during the First World War—the Bulgarian military capital.

Rila Monastery is located on the territory of the Kyustendil Province. The city, especially because of its historical significance, was specially visited by the first person to take off in space—Yuri Gagarin.

== Before Christ ==
Thracian tribes inhabiting the area around the city were participants in the Trojan War on the side of Troy. A Thracian settlement was founded at the location of the modern town in the 5th-4th centuries BC and was known for its asclepion, a shrine dedicated to the god of medicine Asclepius (the second largest in the Balkans, after the one in Epidaurus).

Dentheletae in the period 186 BC – 16 BC were allied to the Romans and assisted in the conquest of neighboring Macedonia by the Romans, fighting against Perseus of Macedon.

In 55 BC in the famous speech of Cicero before the Roman Senate against Lucius Calpurnius Piso Caesoninus (consul 58 BC), who is still governor of Macedonia (57–55 BC), criticized the Roman governor of Macedonia, saying his unwise policy made the Dentheletae of Rome's most loyal subjects into its most eminent enemies.

== New era ==
Under the name Pautalia (Ancient Greek: Παυταλία or Πανταλία) it was a town in the district of Dentheletica. Pautalia obtained town rights in 106 with Serdica, Philippopolis and Augustae Traiana in the Roman province of Thrace.

In the reign of Hadrian, the people both of Pautalia and Serdica added Ulpia to the name of their town, probably in consequence of some benefit received from that emperor. Stephanus of Byzantium has a district called Paetalia (Παιταλία), which he assigns to Thrace, probably a false reading.

In the 1st century AD, it was administratively part of Macedonia. Later the city was part of the province of Dacia Mediterranea and the third largest city in the province.

From the end of the 2nd century to the beginning of the 3rd century Pautalia cut his bronze coins (more than 900 species have been found so far) with testimonials on them and on the emperors Septimius Severus with Julia Domna and Caracalla.

The Roman fortress of Pautalia of the 2nd to 4th century had an area of over 29 hectares (appr. 72 acres). The fortress wall was built mainly of granite blocks and unusually its façade was supported with pillars and arches behind. The wall was 2.5m wide allowing small catapults to be mounted atop.

A second, smaller fortress of area 2 hectares was built in the town in the 4th century (known by its later Ottoman name Hisarlaka). Recent excavations have revealed an early Christian, late Roman monumental bishop's palace.

=== Middle Ages ===
In the Razmetanitsa locality, east of the town, were located the father lands of Cometopuli dynasty, and in Tsarichina (locality) /Palatovo/—the summer residence of Tsar Samuil.

The town was mentioned under the Slavic name of Velbazhd in a 1019 charter by the Byzantine Emperor Basil II. It became a major religious and administrative centre of the Byzantine Empire, and subsequently the Second Bulgarian Empire after Kaloyan conquered the area between 1201 and 1203.

In 1282, king Stefan Milutin defeated the Byzantine Empire and conquered Velbazhd.

=== Ottoman era ===
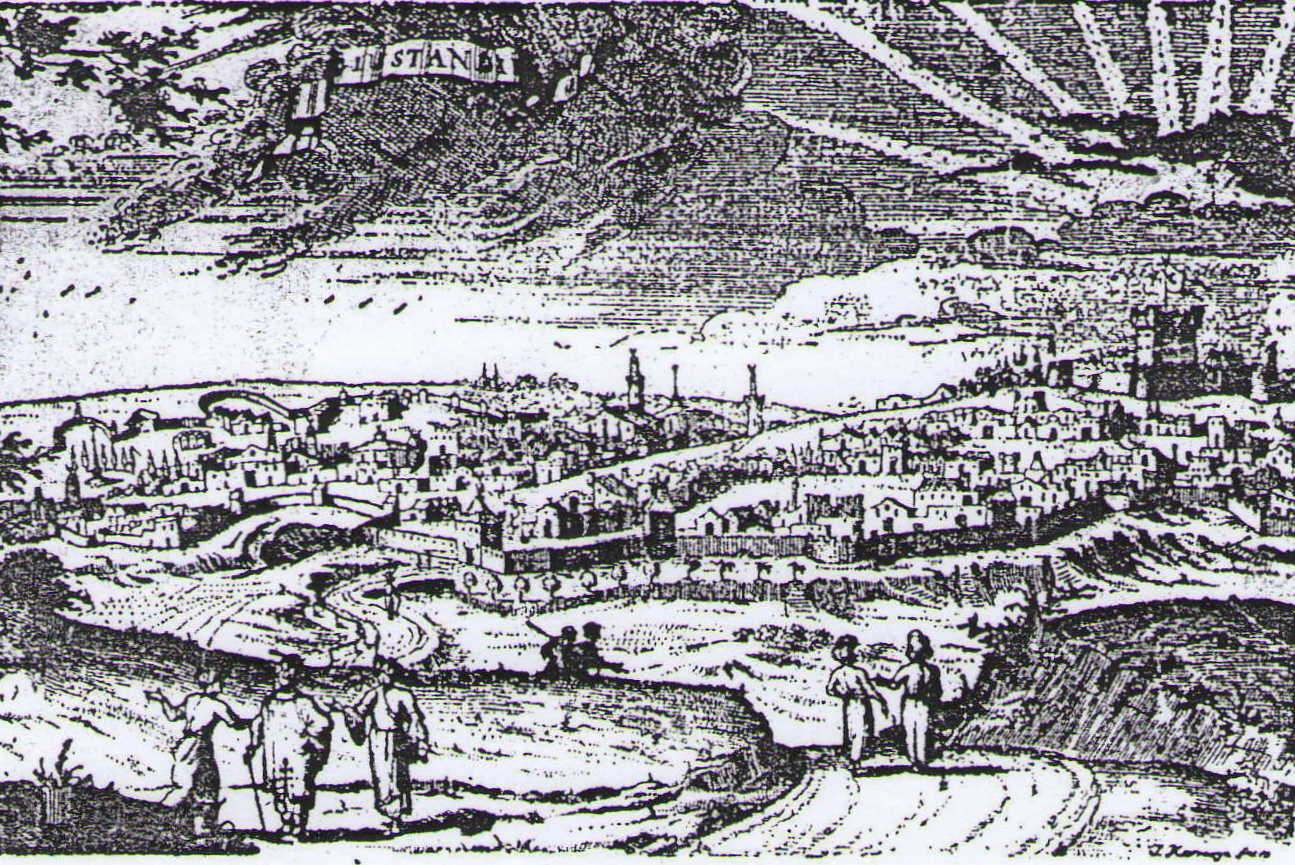
Kyustendil, 1690. Earliest known image. Three centuries earlier, the city had not seen a hostile army. Last year, Skopje was set on fire and the city was attacked by the Hajduks of Strahil voivode.

Mehmed the Conqueror sat with his viziers in the city. Despite his faith, he is one of the Ktetors of the Osogovo Monastery. A traveling knight reports that in 1499 the Ottoman sultan kept his harem in the city.

The city was a sanjak centre initially in Rumelia governorate-general, after that in the Bitola and Niš vilayets (province). It was a kaza centre in the Sofia sanjak of Danube Province until the creation of the Principality of Bulgaria in 1878.

In 1561 and in 1655 the city was struck by the plague. In 1585 and in 1641 the city was destroyed by two major earthquakes.

=== Modern ===
By the 20th century the town extended south of the Banska River. He had four gates called kapı – Palanechka /to Kriva Palanka/ to the west; Niška to the north /to Niš/; Stambolska to the east /to Istanbul/ and Granitska to the south /to the Granitsa, Kyustendil Province/.

The city is the military capital of Bulgaria during the two world wars. In 1916, Kyustendil was visited by Field Marshal August von Mackensen and Gustav Stresemann.

In May 1918, the Austro-Hungarian Emperor Charles I of Austria was here, and on 9 September 1918, the Bavarian King Ludwig III of Bavaria.

Adolf Hitler was never in Kyustendil during the First World War as has been previously alleged. Hitler was a member of the Bavarian 16th Infantry Reserve Regiment was stationed Western Front in Belgium and France. The unit was never stationed on the Macedonian Front. While in Belgium and France Hitler served as a regimental HQ dispatch runner.He was treated for his mustard gas blindness suffered October 13-14, 1918 at the military Pasewalk Military Hospital in Pomerania. According to Armbruster and Theiss-Abenroth, 2016 these are proven facts.

Since 1966, every year on 21 March, the city celebrates its holiday called "Kyustendil Spring". On 11 June 1966, Yuri Gagarin visited the city, symbolically planting a tree.

In 1977 the city centre was declared an Architectural and archeological reserve "Pautalia – Velbazhd".

In 1988 the first Bulgarian regional encyclopedia dedicated to Kyustendil and its region was published.

== See also ==
- Moscow, third Rome
- The Legend of Mehmed Sultan
- Negotiations of Bulgaria with the Central Powers and the Entente
- Death of Boris III
