= Iwan T. Aminoff =

Swedish Army officer and author (1868–1928)

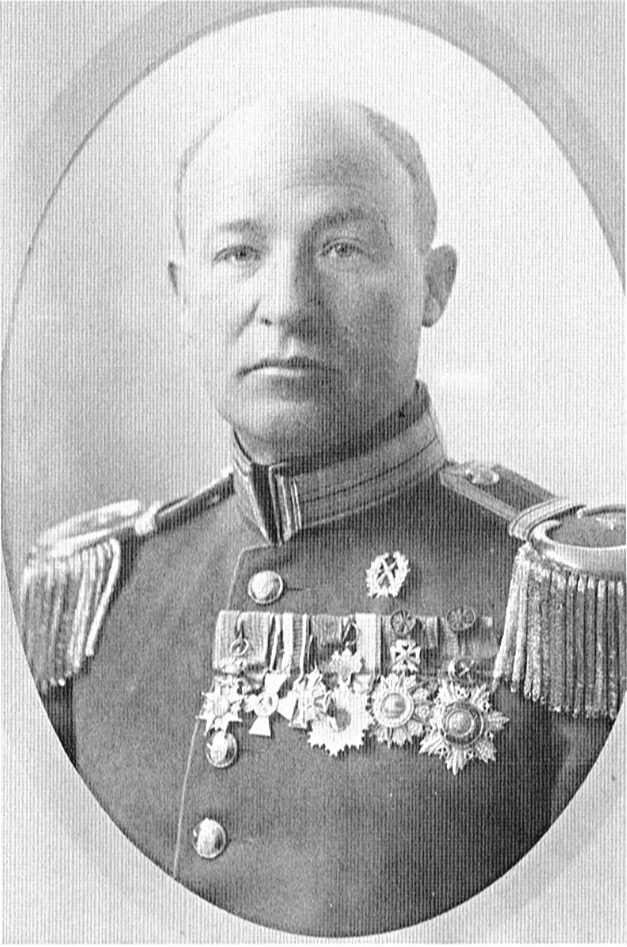

Personal details
- Born: May 8, 1868 Stockholm, Sweden–Norway
- Died: April 6, 1928 (aged 59) Gävle, Sweden

Military service
- Branch/service: Swedish Army (1888–1918) French Army (1896–1897)
- Years of service: 1888–1918
- Rank: Överstelöjtnant

Iwan Tönnes Edvard Aminoff (1868–1928) was a Swedish Army officer and science fiction author. He sometimes wrote under the pen name Radscha, after Ratsha of Kiev, the legendary founder of the Aminoff family.

== Biography ==
Aminoff's parents were sea captain Iwan Fredrik Aminoff and Anna Constance Aminoff, née Hummel. The Aminoff family (Аминовы) originally came from Russia, but immigrated to Swedish Finland in the early 17th century.

In 1888, Aminoff became a second lieutenant in the Bohuslän Regiment. He was promoted to major in the Skaraborg Regiment in 1913, and finally to lieutenant colonel in the Karlskrona Grenadier Regiment in 1916. In 1896–1897, he served in the French Army in Algeria.

Between 1899 and 1902, Aminoff wrote two accounts of his travels in the Near East and North Africa as well as a biography of Count Magnus Stenbock.

During the Russo-Japanese War, Aminoff was involved in Swedish efforts to secretly support Japan with military intelligence. Aminoff helped Nils D. Edlund and Axel Klingenstierna organize an espionage network inside Russia. The information they collected was forwarded to Col. Akashi Motojirō and his agents across Europe.

Aminoff opposed the dissolution of the union between Norway and Sweden in 1905 because he expected Norway to come under attack by Russia as soon as the former was no longer defended by Swedish troops. In 1906–1907, Aminoff wrote a novel in 2 volumes depicting this scenario titled The Russo-Norwegian War (Kriget Norge-Ryssland).

In 1911, Aminoff wrote the first Swedish novel about aeronautics, Lords of the Air (Luftens herrar). In 1913, he wrote the children's novel Gool's Adventure (Gools äventyr), notable for being an early attempt to depict the age of dinosaurs.

At the outbreak of the First World War, Aminoff began writing Radscha's War Novels (Radschas krigsromaner), a narrative series on the course of the war and its background. He completed 30 volumes in the series before it was discontinued in 1915. The series was characterized by pro-German sentiment. In 1917, Aminoff traveled to the Western Front as a military attaché.

Aminoff spent his final years writing adventure novels. He died in 1928.

== Bibliography ==
- Aminoff, Iwan T. (1899). I turban och chechia [In Turban and Shashiya] (in Swedish) (1st ed.). Stockholm: Svenska Telegrambyrån.
- Aminoff, Iwan T. (1900). Tuareger m. fl. berättelser från franska kolonierna i Afrika [Tuaregs and other Stories from the French Colonies in Africa] (in Swedish) (1st ed.). Stockholm: Svenska Telegrambyrån.
- Aminoff, Iwan T. (1902). En hjältesaga [A Hero's Tale] (in Swedish) (1st ed.). Stockholm: Weijmers Bokförlag AB.

== Honors ==
- Order of the Rising Sun (Japan)
- Order of the Sword (Sweden)
