= Ivar Aminoff =

Finnish lawyer and politician

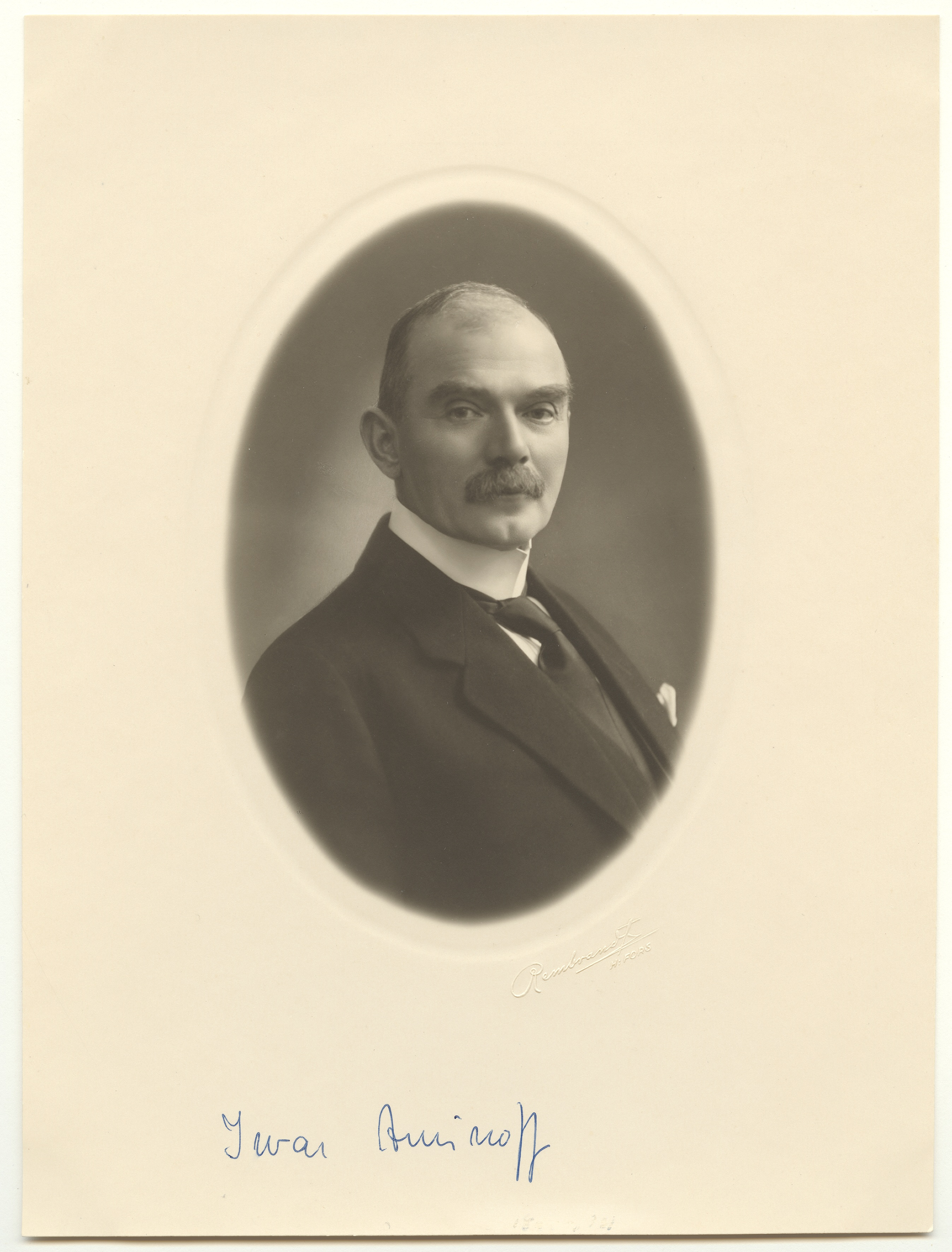

Personal details
- Born: Ivar Aminoff; 12 February 1868 Turku, Finland
- Died: 15 August 1931 Lemu
- Occupation: Lawyer; Politician

Ivar (Iwar) Aminoff (2 December 1868 — 15 August 1931) was a Finnish lawyer and politician. He was the Minister of Defence for 82 days in the spring of 1924, from 11 March to 31 May 1924. He worked as a lawyer in Turku from 1892 to 1916. He served as secretary of the county of Turku and Pori County and was the acting governor in 1918. He also served on the Turku City Council 1904–1912 and was its vice-president in 1908. He had also owned the manor Tenala in Lemu from 1900.
