= Koporye =

Russian village

Koporye Копорье
- Selo
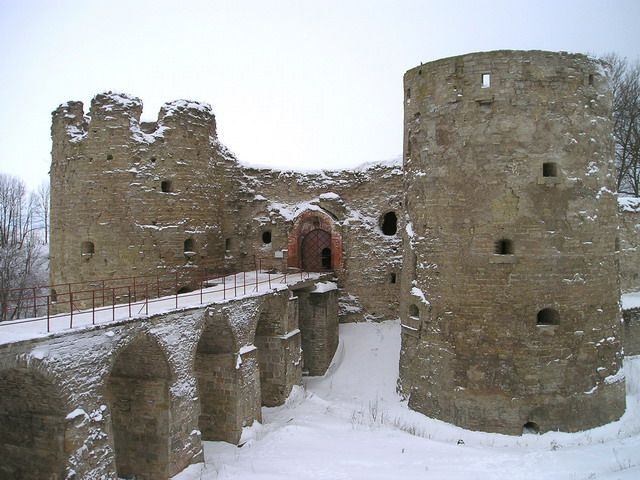
- Entrance to Koporye Fortress
- Interactive map of Koporye
- Location of Koporye
- Coordinates: 59°42′N 29°03′E=
- Country: Russia
- Founded: 1237 (Julian)

Area
  - Total: 408.9 km^{2} (157.9 sq mi)

Koporye (Russian: Копорье; Finnish: Kaprio; Swedish: Koporje) is a historic village (selo) in Leningrad Oblast, Russia, located about 100 km (62 mi) west of St. Petersburg and 12 km (7.5 mi) south of the Koporye Bay of the Baltic Sea. Its population in 2017 was 1,603.

== History ==
The first wooden fortress on the coast of the Koporye Bay was built by the Teutonic Knights in the winter of 1240, only to be destroyed by Alexander Nevsky the next year. The second fortress was built in stone by Alexander's son Dmitry Alexandrovich in 1280. Enraged by the prince's independence, the Novgorodians razed the fortress two years later.

The Swedes took advantage of the lack of a fortress and occupied the banks of the Narva River. The Novgorodians had to restore the stone fort in 1297. Koporye was the strongest stronghold in the region and survived numerous attacks during the Swedish–Novgorodian Wars. In the 14th and 15th centuries, the town was given several times to mercenary princes invited by Novgorodians to protect the northern territories of the republic. While the town had an important fortress, the residences of a prince and several lesser landowners, and was the centre of an important iron-working district, it remained very small, with only 18 households by the end of 15th century.

After Novgorod's incorporation into Muscovy, the fortress was strengthened and rebuilt to withstand cannon fire. Most extant structures belong to that period. Russian forces surrendered Koporye during the Livonian War but regained it under the Treaty of Tyavzino.

During the Time of Troubles, Koporye was attacked by some 2,000 Swedes. The Russian garrison had to surrender. In 1656, Russia unsuccessfully tried to retake the village. Koporye remained Swedish until 1703, known as Koporje or Caporie/Capurien, constituting an important part of Swedish Ingria.

As the Gulf of Finland grew shallow and receded to the north, the site began to lose its maritime importance. In 1703, during the Great Northern War, a major Russian army under Boris Sheremetev regained Koporye, which was defended by 80 Swedish soldiers under the commandant, Captain Wasili Apolloff. Huge gaps in the walls from the disastrous fire of the Russian artillery may still be seen.

Despite some repairs undertaken in the 19th century, the fortress survives in a ruined state. Today, it is a museum.
