= Ivan Peresvetov =

Russian social critic

- Иван Пересветов
- Died: 1550s or 1560s
- Occupations: medieval politician, progressive social critic

Ivan Semyonovich Peresvetov (also transliterated as Peresvietov; Russian: Ива́н Семёнович Пересве́тов; died 1550s or 1560s) was a Russian political thinker and progressive social critic, who wrote during the reign of Ivan the Terrible. Among the works he is most known for is The Tale of Mehmet the Sultan, a political allegory prescribing strong autocratic governance.

== Biography ==
Peresvetov was born in the early 16th century in the Grand Duchy of Lithuania, to a Ruthenian family of the lower nobility. The exact date of his birth is not known. He claimed heritage from the legendary hero-monk Alexander Peresvet, whose duel with Temir-Murza is said to have been the overture to the historic Battle of Kulikovo. In the 1520s and 1530s, he was a soldier in the service of King John I Zápolya of Hungary and later Ferdinand I of Habsburg (and possibly also Petru Rareș of Moldavia), alongside other Polish and Lithuanian nobles owing allegiance to Polish King Sigismund I. He is thought to have come to Muscovy in 1538 or 1539, and entered the service of Ivan IV the Terrible of Muscovy.

Shortly after arriving in Muscovy, Peresvetov was commissioned to manufacture hussar shields for the Muscovite military, under the patronage of a boyar. His noble protector soon died, which left Peresvetov living in relative poverty. During his time in Russia, Peresvetov wrote a number of petitions and allegorical tales. In 1549 he submitted his two Petitions to Ivan IV, who by that time had become Tsar of Russia. His other works were also published around the same time. Peresvetov's advocacies in his writing presumably found favour with Ivan the Terrible, although it is unclear to what extent and if they influenced the Tsar's policies. The supposed agreement between Peresvetov's proposals and Ivan the Terrible's reforms (along with some erroneous chronological assumptions) led some early investigators (most notably Nikolay Karamzin) to believe that they were written retrospectively and that Peresvetov's authorship of the text was forged. It has also been suggested that the writings attributed to Peresvetov are in fact the work of Ivan the Terrible himself, written under a pseudonym. Subsequent scholars have maintained the authenticity of Peresvetov's work. For more about these and other controversies, see below.

Peresvetov most likely died sometime in the 1550s or 1560s, in the Tsardom of Russia.

== Writing ==
Peresvetov is the author of several allegorical political writings and also a couple of petitions and essays addressed directly to the Tsar. The message that reoccurs in most of his writings is the virtue of strong, centralized, autocratic governance. He also advocated for the establishment of a salaried and meritocratically organized professional army.

Peresvetov's more prominent works were ostensibly an account of the Ottoman conquest of Constantinople by Sultan Mehmed II but actually provided a covert, allegorical denunciation of the privileges still enjoyed by the boyars. Peresvetov’s support of the demands of the military class over that of the boyars presumably found favour with Ivan IV, who had to overcome boyar direction of the government to establish himself as the first Tsar. Peresvetov advocated strong, autocratic rule coupled with a well-organized army and administration. His advocacy of promotion based on merit and military service was too radical for his time, however, as was his call for the abolition of all indenture.

Peresvetov wrote in an energetic folk Russian that contrasted sharply with the Church Slavonic style of the period.

== Historical and literary context ==
Soviet historians explain Peresvetov's advocacy in terms of the author's own status as a member of the low nobility (dvoryanstvo), at the time a rising social class in Russia that was in conflict with the traditional noble class – the boyars. The low noblemen wanted to gain more influence and privileges in the Muscovite society, whereas the boyars sought to maintain their hegemony.

== Speculation about Peresvetov ==
=== The truthfulness of Peresvetov's identity ===
Nikolay Karamzin questioned the existence of Ivan Peresvetov and proposed the idea that it was a pseudonym for Ivan the Terrible himself, or a fabrication of later historiographers meaning to depict Ivan the Terrible and his reforms in a positive way. Most subsequent historians do not agree with the assumption that it is a pseudonym, and rather believe that there is sufficient archival evidence that Ivan Peresvetov did in fact exist.

=== The authenticity of Peresvetov's works ===
Only copies are left of the original manuscripts of Peresvetov's works. Most of what is consistent across the different versions can be assumed to have been left unchanged from the original writings. However, there are numerous inconsistencies between the extant copies. To what degree the extant copies reflect Peresvetov's own work and to what degree they reflect the amendments made by subsequent scribes has been a subject of inquiry for historians studying the works of Ivan Peresvetov.

== Works ==
- 1st Petition, also Greater Petition (Russian: «1-ая челобитная» [Pervaya chelobitnaya]; «Большая челобитная» [Bol'shaya chelobitnaya])
- 2nd Petition, also Lesser Petition (Russian: «2-ая челобитная» [Vtoraya chelobitnaya]; «Малая челобитная» [Malaya chelobitnaya])
- The Story of the Capture of Constantinople (Russian: «Повесть о взятии Царьграда» [Povest' o vzyatii Tsar'grada])
- The Tale of Emperor Constantine (Russian: «Сказание о царе Константине» [Skazanie o tsare Konstantine])
- The Tale of Mehmet the Sultan (Russian: «Сказание о Магмете-салтане» [Skazanie o Magmete-saltane])
- Predictions of the Philosophers and the Doctors (Russian: «Предсказания философов и докторов» [Predskazaniya filosofov I doktorov])
- The Tale of Books (Russian: «Сказание о книгах» [Skazanie o knigakh])
