= Buturlin =

Buturlin (masculine, Russian: Бутурлин) or Buturlina (feminine, Russian: Бутурлина) is a Russian surname. Notable people with the surname include:

- Alexander Buturlin (1694–1767), Russian general
- Alexander Buturlin (ice hockey) (born 1981), Russian ice hockey player
- Alexey Buturlin (1802–1863), Russian lieutenant general, younger brother of Dmitry
- Anna Artemevna Buturlina (1777–1854), Russian artist and noblewoman
- Dmitry Buturlin (1790–1849), Russian statesman and writer, older brother of Alexey
- Sergei Buturlin (1872–1938), Russian ornithologist
- Vasiliy Buturlin (? – 1656), Russian boyar and voyevoda
- Victor Buturlin (1946–2022), Russian filmmaker
