= Bengt Horn =

Swedish field marshal and statesman (1623–1678)

Baron Bengt Horn
- Bengt Horn af Åminne in 1651

Governor-General of Halland
- In office 1654–1655
- Preceded by: Nils Kagg
- Succeeded by: Axel Lillie

Governor of Estonia
- In office 1656–1674
- Preceded by: Wilhelm von Ulrich
- Succeeded by: Wilhelm von Ulrich

President of Svea Court of Appeal
- In office 1674–1677
- Preceded by: Johan Gyllenstierna the Younger
- Succeeded by: Knut Kurck

Personal details
- Born: Bengt Klasson Horn; November 10, 1623 Rytterne, Västmanland County, Sweden
- Died: February 7, 1678 (aged 54) Riga, Swedish Livonia
- Spouse(s): Margareta Larsdotter Sparre; Ingeborg Banér; Margareta Bielke
- Relations: Krister Horn
- Children: Christer Bengtsson Horn af Åminne; Katarina Ebba Horn af Åminne; Ture Sigismund Horn
- Parent(s): Klas Horn; Sigrid Oxenstierna
- Education: Uppsala University

Military service
- Allegiance: Swedish Empire
- Rank: Field Marshal (Fältmarskalk)
- Unit: Blue Regiment; Stenbock Infantry Regiment; Queen's Life Regiment of Foot
- Commands: Commandant of Ottersberg and Vechta; Queen's Life Regiment of Foot; Superviser of the garrisons in the Baltic Dominions; Commander-in-chief of the Livonian expedition
- Battles/wars: Thirty Years' War; Bavarian campaign; Attack on Bregenz; Capture of Mainau; Siege of Lindau; Northern War; Deluge; Siege of Marienburg; Russo-Swedish War; Livonian campaign; Siege of Dorpat; Scanian War; Prussian expedition

Bengt Klasson Horn af Åminne (November 10, 1623 – February 7, 1678) was a Swedish Baron, Diplomat, Judge, Field Marshal (Fältmarskalk), and governor-general. He was governor-general of Halland from 1654 to 1655, and governor of Estonia between 1656 and 1674. He served as a lieutenant colonel in the Thirty Years' War and was promoted to commander of the Queen's Life Regiment of Foot during the Deluge. Horn was the head of a mission to Russia, which resulted in the Treaty of Cardis. During the Scanian War he was given command of an expedition to Prussia, but his fleet was wrecked by a storm. He died not long after, in 1678.

== Early life and service (1623–1655) ==
Horn was born on November 10, 1623, in Rytterne, Västmanland County. His parents were Privy Council member Klas Horn and Sigrid Oxenstierna, daughter of Bengt Gabrielsson Oxenstierna. He was the middle child of Klas's five children. Horn went to the University of Uppsala with his brother, Krister, in April 1636. After that he traveled to the Baltic region, and studied in Dorpat (Tartu). He completed his education with a trip abroad. During this trip he visited the Dutch Republic and traveled to Italy via France, he stayed in Rome until 1646.

Horn joined the Swedish Army in 1646 during the Thirty Years' War and joined Carl Gustaf Wrangel during his Bavarian campaign. He obtained the rank of captain in the Blue Regiment. The following year, he was promoted to major in Gustaf Otto Stenbock's Regiment, and soon after, lieutenant colonel. He became commandant of Vechta and Ottersberg in 1650. In 1653, he attained the rank of colonel of the newly created Queen's Life Regiment on Foot. In October 1654, he resigned and was appointed Governor-General of Halland by Queen Christina. A year later, he left his governorship to become commander of the Queen's Life Regiment on Foot.

== Northern War (1655–1663) ==
Horn accompanied the new Swedish king, Charles X Gustav, in his Polish campaign. He distinguished himself in the two month siege of the Marienburg Castle (Malbork). In 1656, Horn was appointed Governor of Reval (Tallinn). Around the same time, Tsar Alexei I invaded the Swedish Baltic in support of Poland. He was sent to relieve the Russian siege of Dorpat. However, his relief attempt failed, and Dorpat ultimately capitulated on October 23.

In 1658, he was assigned to be part of the Swedish negotiations with the Russians. The Russian lead delegate, Afanasy Ordin-Nashchokin, demanded Ingria, Kexholm, and several cities and fortresses in Estonia and Livonia. This proposal was rejected by the Swedes. On December 20, a three-year peace was agreed upon. As part of the treaty, Kokenhusen, Dorpat, Marienburg, Neuhausen, Syrensk, Jama, Dinaburg, Lyutin, Anzl, Marnauz, and Rēzekne were ceded to Russia for three years. Although the treaty was a Russian victory, it gave Charles much-needed breathing space.

In 1661, he was appointed head of a mission to Russia. This delegation secured a peace treaty in which Russia ceded back all captured territory and Tsar Alexei renounced all claims to Livonia and Estonia. Horn was able to secure this peace because of Russia's renewed war with Poland.

== Under Charles XI (1663–1678) ==
Upon his return to Estonia, Horn resumed his governorship of Estonia, of which he had already been governor for seven years. He carried out his duties with much competence. In 1672, the young King Charles XI, under the influence of Magnus Gabriel De la Gardie, promoted Horn from governor to governor-general of Estonia. A year later, he was entrusted with the supervision of all garrisons in Estonia, Livonia, and Ingria. In 1675, he was appointed president of the Svea Court of Appeal, an advancement believed to be orchestrated by De la Gardie. His tenure was only three years, and was largely uneventful during his presidency.

== Prussian Expedition (1678) ==
Baron Bengt Horn as a Roman General. Oil painting by David Klöcker Ehrenstrahl

In late 1674, under pressure from France, Sweden invaded Brandenburg. The campaign culminated at the Battle of Fehrbellin, where the Swedes were badly defeated by Elector Frederick William. A Brandenburg-Danish army launched a counterattack into Swedish Pomerania, conquering most of it, except for Stettin, Greifswald, Rügen, and Stralsund. Although Frederick failed to capture Stettin in 1676, a year later he besieged it again.

In response, Charles planned a diversionary attack from Riga to Prussia, in order to relieve Stettin. Horn was given command of the expedition and was promoted to the position of field marshal. Horn was poorly suited for the job. He was old and in poor physical health. He planned to raise 10,000 men, but he suffered from insufficient funds and had to assemble this force so quickly. He disobeyed orders and stayed in Stockholm, where he celebrated his third marriage to Margareta Bielke. He finally left Stockholm on November 8. The voyage across the Åland Sea was marked by stormy weather. Later, while on his way to Riga, his ship got stuck in ice off the Turku Archipelago. This forced him to go overland to Riga, finally arriving on January 17. Stettin had already fallen two months before. This angered Charles, who relieved him of his post. Horn died a broken man on February 7.

== Family ==
Horn married three times and had three children. His first wife was Queen Christina's maid of honor, Margareta Larsdotter Sparre. Her parents were the Lord Marshal (Lantmarskalk) Lars Sparre and Märta Gustafsdotter Banér. She married Horn on November 20, 1652, in Reval and they had one son, Christer Bengtsson. She died only eight years later in Stockholm. After Margareta's death, Horn married Ingeborg Banér, Margareta's first cousin, the daughter of Axel Gustafson Banér and Karin Bielke.

Together they had two children, Katarina Ebba and Ture Sigismund. She died on July 25, 1675, of natural causes. Two years later, he married Ingeborg's second cousin, Margareta Bielke, the daughter of Gustaf Bielke and Maria Elisabet Sparre. They married in Stockholm, which delayed the Livonia Expedition. Unlike his first two wives, Margareta lived longer than Horn, dying on May 10, 1727.

- Christer Bengtsson Horn af Åminne (1659 or 1660-1740); married Jacobina Catharina Lilliehöök
- Katarina Ebba Horn af Åminne (1666-1736); Mistress of the Robes, married Axel Banér
- Ture Sigismund Horn (1674-1724); married Regina Benigna Ludlenska

== Gallery ==
Horn with his two wives: Margareta Sparre and Ingeborg Banér. 1675 oil painting by David Klöcker Ehrenstrahl.

Ingeborg Banér, the second wife of Horn. 1662 oil painting by Ehrenstrahl.

Katarina Ebba Horn af Åminne, daughter of Horn. 1698 oil painting by Amalia von Königsmarck.

Bengt Horn af Åminne, 1623-1678. Copy of a portrait by Ehrenstrahl in 1726, originally by David Kock.

Funeral achievement of Horn in the Norrtälje Municipality.

== Ancestors ==
Ancestors of Bengt Horn

8. Klas Horn
4. Krister Klasson Horn
9. Kerstin Krumme
2. Klas Horn
10. Ture Bielke
5. Catharina Bielke
11. Sigrid Sture
1. Bengt Horn
12. Gabriel Kristiernsson Oxenstierna
6. Bengt Gabrielsson Oxenstierna
13. Beate Eriksdotter Trolle
3. Sigrid Oxenstierna
14. Knut Posse
7. Brita Knutsdotter Posse
15. Ebba Göransdotter

== Sources ==
- "Horn af Åminne". Riddarholmen's funeral register 1659 - 1737.
- "Horn, Bengt". Academy of Music.
- "Bengt Horn". Svenskt biografiskt lexikon.
- "Horn, Bengt (1623-1678)". BBLd – Baltisches Biografisches Lexikon digital. 2026.
- Željko., Fajfrić (2008). Ruski carevi (1. izd ed.). Sremska Mitrovica: Tabernakl. ISBN 9788685269172. OCLC 620935678.
- Neilson, William Allan; Carhart, Paul Worthington; Knott, Thomas Albert (1934). "Webster's New International Dictionary of the English Language: With Reference History. An Entirely New Book Utilizing All the Experience and Resources of More Than One Hundred Years of Genuine Webster Dictionaries. A Merriam-Webster".
- "Nordisk familjebok". Runeberg. 1929.
- von Essen, Michael Fredholm (2019). Charles XI’s War: The Scanian War Between Sweden and Denmark, 1675-1679. Century of the Soldier. Helion & Company. ISBN 9781911628002.

Political offices
Preceded by Nils Kagg	Governor-General of Halland; 1654–1655	Succeeded by Axel Lillie
Preceded by Wilhelm von Ulrich	Governor of Estonia; 1656-1674	Succeeded by Wilhelm von Ulrich
Preceded by Johan Gyllenstierna the Younger	President of Svea Court of Appeal; 1674-1676	Succeeded by Knut Kurck
Preceded by Krister Horn	Magistrate in Swedish Karelia; 1674-1678	Succeeded by Gustaf Oxenstierna
