= Governor of Estonia =

Governor of Estonia may refer to:

- Governor of Swedish Estonia (1561–1674); titled Governors-General in 1674–1728
- Governor of Russian Estonia (1796–1917)
