= Treaty of Brunswick =

1672 treaty of the Holy Roman Empire

- Drafted: 12 September 1672
- Parties: Habsburg Monarchy; Denmark-Norway; Brandenburg-Prussia; Duchy of Brunswick-Lüneburg; Hesse-Kassel; Brunswick-Wolfenbüttel

The Treaty of Brunswick signed in Brunswick, 1672, was a defense treaty between The Holy Roman Empire, Denmark-Norway, Brandenburg-Prussia, Duchy of Brunswick-Lüneburg, Hesse-Kassel and Brunswick-Wolfenbüttel.

During the wars of Louis XIV, both the Grand Alliance and France tried gaining new allies to win the Franco-Dutch War. France and Sweden made an alliance earlier in 1672, and the Dutch were in the process of making an alliance with Denmark. At this time Denmark–Norway was approached by another country, the Habsburg monarchy, to make an alliance.

== Stipulations ==
- The electors of Hesse-Kassel, Brandenburg-Prussia, Brunswick-Lüneburg and the Holy Roman Empire pledged a combined 31,000 troops, of those 10,400 were cavalry.
- Denmark-Norway pledged to bring their army up to 20,000 troops.
- Denmark-Norway obligees to keep the territorial integrity of Austria, Spain and the Netherlands.
