= Treaty of Stockholm =

The Treaty of Stockholm may refer to:

- Treaty of Stockholm (1371)
- Treaty of Stockholm (1435)
- Treaty of Stockholm (1465)
- Treaty of Stockholm (1497)
- Treaty of Stockholm (1502)
- Treaty of Stockholm (1523)
- Treaty of Stockholm (1672)
- The three Treaties of Stockholm (Great Northern War):
  - Treaty of Stockholm (1719) - Hannover
  - Treaty of Stockholm (1720) - Prussia
  - Treaty of Stockholm (1720) - Denmark
- Treaty of Stockholm (1813)
- Treaty of Stockholm (1884) - establishes mutual defensive alliance between Russia and Germany; Russia and Austria-Hungary recognize each other's territorial possessions.
- Stockholm Convention on organic pollutants
