= Siege of Dorpat (1656) =

1656 siege of the Russo-Swedish War

- Part of the Russo-Swedish War (1656–1658)
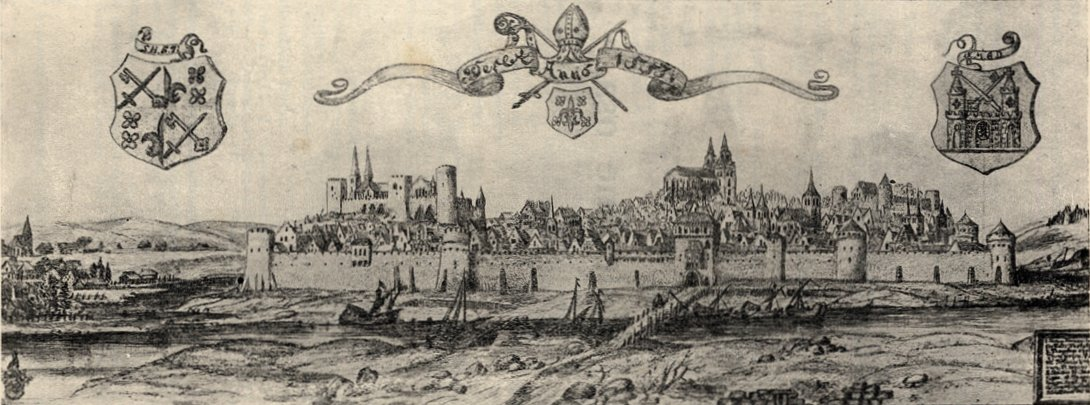
- Dorpat in 1553
Date	Early August – October 23, 1656
Location	Dorpat (modern day Tartu), Estonia
Result	Russian victory
Territorial changes	Dorpat is captured by the Russians

Belligerents
Tsardom of Russia	Swedish Empire

Commanders and leaders
(Tsardom of Russia) Aleksey Trubetskoy	(Swedish Empire) Lars Fleming (surrendered)

Units involved
(Tsardom of Russia) Army of Trubetskoy	(Swedish Empire) Dorpat garrison

Strength
10,546 men	593 men Several hundred burghers

Casualties and losses
69 dead 276 wounded	Entire garrison surrendered

The siege of Dorpat (Swedish: Belägringen av Drept), also known in Russian historiography as the German campaign of Trubetskoy (Russian: Немецкий поход Трубецкого), was a siege of the Swedish castle Dorpat by Russian troops that took place from August to October 1656.

== Prelude ==
Under the plan of the Russian command, in the campaign of 1656 the main blow was inflicted on Riga, where a large army led by Tsar Alexis advanced from Polotsk . Auxiliary blows were applied from Pskov to Dorpat (Russian: Yuryev) and from Novgorod to Noteburg (Oreshek) and Nyenschanz. The capture of Dorpat was entrusted to the army of Alexey Trubetskoy.

The army of Trubetskoy was quite numerous. On the paper there were 5546 cavalry (3327 nobles, 832 Reiters, 622 Cossacks and 102 Tatars) and about 5,000 infantry (3 Streltsy orders and 4 regiments of the New Order). The garrison of the fortress, commanded by Lars Fleming, consisted of an infantry regiment (448 soldiers in 5 companies), 45 artillerymen and about 100 regular cavalrymen. They were supported by several hundred armed burghers.

== Siege ==
The main forces of the Russian army approached the fortress in the early days of August. The Swedish garrison actively opposed siege operations, undertaking frequent forays. The fighting was not limited to fighting at the walls of the fortress. The Swedish troops attempted to break through the blockade and conduct reinforcements to Dorpat. The attempt to undermine the walls was not successful, and artillery was also not effective. The best siege guns were sent to the main army near Riga, the quantity and power available was not enough. By this time the main army had already failed at the siege of Riga. On October 23, the Swedish garrison had agreed to an honorable surrender. This was affected by heavy losses from shelling and disease (there were only 140 soldiers left) and the lack of assistance and news from the outside.

== Aftermath ==
The capture of Yuryev became the greatest success of the Russian army in the war, especially significant against the background of the failure of the main Russian army in the siege of Riga. The city, despite the attempt of the Swedes to retake it, remained in the hands of the Russian troops until the end of the war. Only in 1661 according to the peace treaty the city was returned to Sweden.
