= Duchy of Estonia (1561–1721) =

Estonia under Swedish rule

Coordinates: 59°26′N 24°45′E

Duchy of Estonia Hertigdömet Estland (Swedish) Eestimaa hertsogkond (Estonian) Herzogtum Estland (German)
- 1561–1721
- Coat of arms

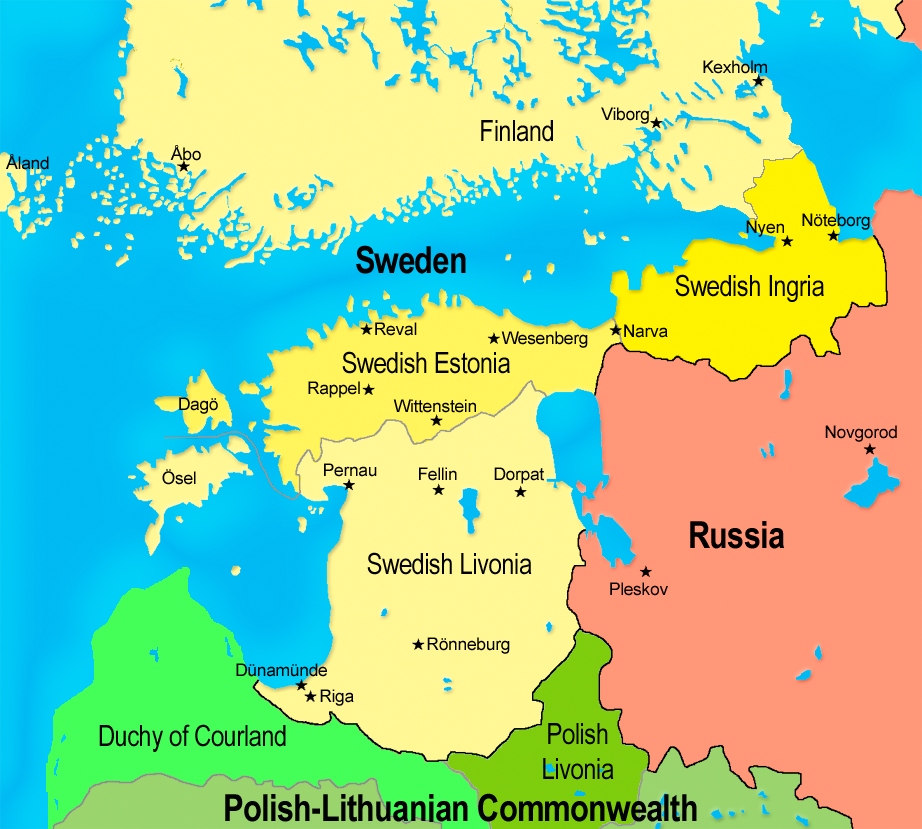
- Baltic provinces of Swedish Empire in the 17th century.
- Status: Dominion of the Swedish Empire
- Capital: Reval (Tallinn)
- Common languages: German, Estonian, Swedish
- Religion: Lutheranism
- King
- Governor-General
  - 1674–1681: Anders Torstenson
  - 1687–1704: Axel Julius de la Gardie
- History
  - Established: 4 June 1561
  - Treaty of Nystad: 10 September 1721
- Today part of: Estonia

The Duchy of Estonia (Swedish: Hertigdömet Estland; Estonian: Eestimaa hertsogkond; German: Herzogtum Estland), also known as Swedish Estonia (Swedish: Svenska Estland), was a dominion of the Swedish Empire from 1561 until 1721 during the time that most or all of Estonia was under Swedish rule. The territory was eventually ceded to Russia in the Treaty of Nystad, following its capitulation during a plague outbreak in the Great Northern War.

The dominion arose during the Livonian War, when the northern parts of present-day Estonia — Reval (Tallinn) and the counties of Harjumaa, Western Virumaa, Raplamaa and Järvamaa — submitted to the Swedish king in 1561, and Läänemaa in 1581.

It is also colloquially known as the "good old Swedish times" (Estonian: vana hea Rootsi aeg) by Estonians, but this expression was not used before the following Russian rule, in the beginning of which the situation of Estonian peasantry declined rapidly; to gain the support of the German Baltic nobility, Russia gave them more power over the peasantry.

== List of governors ==
=== Governors (1561–1674) ===
- Lars Ivarsson Fleming (2 August 1561 – 27 February 1562)
- Klas Horn (acting; August 1561)
- Henrik Klasson Horn (1st time; 27 February 1562 – June 1562)
- Svante Stensson Sture (30 June 1562 – 27 July 1564)
- Hermann Pedersson Fleming (1564–1565)
- Henrik Klasson Horn (2nd time; 30 January 1565 – 1568)
- Gabriel Kristiernsson Oxenstierna (November 1568 – 1570)
- Hans Björnsson Lejon (9 October 1570 – 1572)
- Clas Åkesson Tott (6 November 1572 – 1574)
- Pontus De la Gardie (4 June 1574 – December 1575)
- Karl Henriksson Horn (1st time; January 1576 – May 1578)
- Hans Eriksson of Brinkkala (acting; 19 April 1576 – 1577)
- Göran Boije (1st time; 1 August 1577 – 1580)
- Svante Eriksson Stålarm (1580–1581)
- Göran Boije (2nd time; 25 April 1582 – 1583)
- Pontus De la Gardie (1583 – 5 November 1585)
- Gustaf Gabrielsson Oxenstierna af Eka och Lindö (8 November 1585 – 1588)
- Hans Wachtmeister (acting; July 1588 – 13 October 1588)
- Gustaf Axelsson Banér (13 October 1588 – 1590)
- Erik Gabrielsson Oxenstierna (1590 – July 1592)
- Göran Boije (3rd time; 1592 – June 1600)
- Karl Henriksson Horn (2nd time, acting; 1600 – 30 January 1601)
- Moritz Stensson Leijonhufvud (1601 – October 1602)
- Nils Turesson Bielke (10 May 1605 – June 1605)
- Axel Nilsson Ryning (1605–1608)
- Gabriel Bengtsson Oxenstierna (1611–1617)
- Anders Eriksson Hästehufvud (1617–1619)
- Jakob De la Gardie (July 1619 – 1622)
- Per Gustafsson Banér (1622 – January 1626)
- Johan De la Gardie (1626 – October 1628)
- Philipp von Scheiding (1628 – 17 July 1642)
- Gustaf Gabrielsson Oxenstierna af Cronenborg (26 July 1642 – 1646)
- Erik Axelsson Oxenstierna (9 September 1646 – 1653)
- Wilhelm von Ulrich (1st time, acting; May 1653 – 16 August 1653)
- Heinrich von Thurn (16 August 1653 – 1655)
- Wilhelm von Ulrich (2nd time, acting; 1655 – August 1655)
- Bengt Skytte (1655–1656)
- Wilhelm von Ulrich (3rd time, acting; 1655– 2 August 1656)
- Bengt Horn (2 August 1656 – November 1674)
- Wilhelm von Ulrich (4th time, acting; 1656–1659)
- Johan Christoffer von Scheiding (acting; 1674)

=== Governors-General (1674–1728) ===
- Andreas Lennartson Torstensson (1674–1681)
- Robert Johannson Lichton (April 1681 – 1687)
- Nils Turesson Bielke (20 January 1687 – 19 April 1687)
- Axel Julius De la Gardie (1687 – December 1704)
- Wolmar Anton von Schlippenbach (December 1704 – 6 July 1706)
- Niels Jonsson Stromberg af Clastorp (6 July 1706 – 23 October 1709)
- Carl Nieroth (23 October 1709 – 10 October 1710)

== See also ==
- Estonia under Swedish rule
- Dominium maris baltici
- Dominions of Sweden
- Swedish Livonia
- Estonian Swedes
- Governorate of Estonia
- Uniformity policy
