= Uniformity policy =

Concept of implementing Swedish law to the dominions of Sweden

The uniformity policy was the concept of implementing Swedish law to the dominions of Sweden during the latter's time as an empire. It is symbolized by the slogan unus rex, una lex et grex unus ("one king, one law, one people") possibly coined by Johan Skytte, governor-general in Swedish Estonia, Ingria and Livonia. However, the phrase is also found in the debates on the possible union of Scotland and England in 1607, when Sir Edwyn Sandys noted King James VI and I's view that for a perfect union there should be unus rex, unus grex, una lex.

Most notably, the uniformity policy aimed at abolishing serfdom then common in Estonia, Livonia and the Swedish dominions in the Holy Roman Empire (Ingermanland naturally had a free peasantry). It was implemented in Livonia against the will of the local Baltic German nobles, which led many of them, under the leadership of Johann Patkul, to side with Peter the Great and the Russian Empire during the Great Northern War. The Estonian and Pomeranian peasants remained serfs: Estonia had voluntarily submitted to Sweden and thus had been given leeway in keeping the traditional local law code, while Swedish Pomerania had retained its traditional law code when, on behalf of the then ruling Swedish high nobility, the Peace of Westphalia granted it to the King of Sweden while remaining part of the Holy Roman Empire, and not in a formal cession which would have resulted in the implementation of Swedish law. Swedish law was thus only introduced to Swedish Pomerania after the dissolution of the Holy Roman Empire in 1806, and then by a coup d'etat organized by King Gustav IV Adolf.
