= Swedish Empire =

Historical period in the history of Sweden (1611–1721)

Kingdom of Sweden Konungariket Sverige (Swedish)
- 1611–1721
- State flag Royal coat of arms

- The Swedish Empire, following the Treaty of Roskilde in 1658
- Capital: Stockholm
- Common languages: Swedish
- Religion: Church of Sweden (official)
- Government: Absolute monarchy (1680–1719); Parliamentary constitutional monarchy (1611–1680; 1719–1721)
- King/Queen
  - 1611–1632 (first): Gustavus Adolphus
  - 1632–1654: Christina
  - 1654–1660: Charles X Gustav
  - 1660–1697: Charles XI
  - 1697–1718: Charles XII
  - 1718–1720: Ulrika Eleonora
  - 1720–1721 (last): Frederick I
- Legislature: Riksdag of the Estates
- History
  - Coronation of Gustavus Adolphus: 30 October 1611
  - Beginning of constitutional monarchy: 29 July 1634
  - Queen Ulrika Eleonora abdicated: 24 March 1720
  - Reconstituted: 2 May 1720
  - Treaty of Nystad: 10 September 1721
- Currency: Riksdaler
Preceded by	Succeeded by
History of Sweden (1523–1611)	Age of Liberty

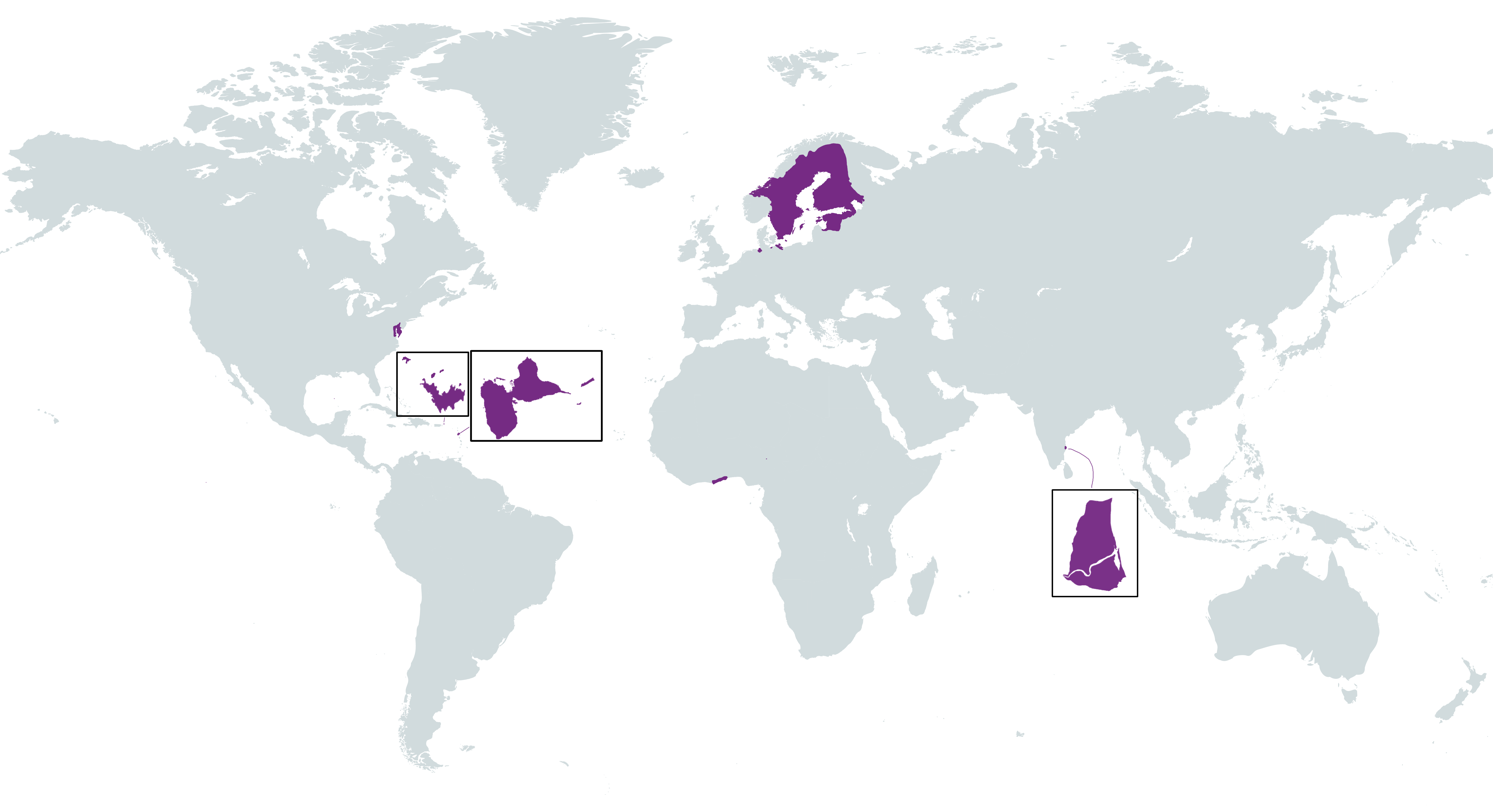
Swedish Empire including overseas territories

The Swedish Empire, referred to in Sweden as the Great Power Era (Swedish: stormaktstiden), was the period in Swedish history spanning much of the 17th and early 18th centuries during which Sweden was a European great power that exercised territorial control over much of the Baltic region. During this period, it also held territories on the North Sea including overseas colonies, such as New Sweden. The beginning of the period is usually taken as the reign of Gustavus Adolphus, who ascended the throne in 1611, and its end as the loss of territories in 1721 following the Great Northern War.

After the death of Gustavus Adolphus in 1632, the empire was controlled for lengthy periods by part of the high nobility, such as the Oxenstierna family, acting as regents for under-aged monarchs.

After its victories in the Thirty Years' War and the subsequent Peace of Westphalia Sweden was granted territories in northern Germany. Sweden reached the height of its power during the Northern War of 1655–1660, when its primary adversary, Denmark–Norway, was neutralized by the Treaty of Roskilde in 1658. Denmark–Norway was forced to give up a third of its territory to save the rest. Although the reign of Charles XII would see initial Swedish victories in the Peace of Travendal (1700) and the Treaty of Altranstädt (1706), he would go on to lead a campaign in Russia that would end in a decisive defeat at the Battle of Poltava. The Russian victory put an end to Sweden's territorial expansion, and by the time of Charles XII's death in 1718 the Empire had been severely diminished both territorially and militarily. Finland was ceded to Russia in 1809, and Sweden's last remaining continental territory (Swedish Pomerania) was ceded to Denmark in exchange for Norway following the Napoleonic Wars.

== History ==
=== Emergence as a great power ===
Sweden emerged as a great European power under Axel Oxenstierna and King Gustavus Adolphus. As a result of acquiring territories seized from Russia and the Polish–Lithuanian Commonwealth, as well as its involvement in the Thirty Years' War, Sweden found itself transformed into the leader of Protestantism.

Sweden's rise was supported by a rapidly expanding metals economy. By the early seventeenth century, Sweden had become northern Europe's leading exporter of iron and copper; together the two metals accounted for nearly 63% of national exports in 1637 and more than 80% in 1685. Under Gustavus Adolphus, the Crown also exploited the Stora Kopparberg copper mine at Falun, then the largest copper mine in Europe, using its revenues to help finance the king's political and military ambitions.

During the Thirty Years' War, Sweden managed to conquer approximately half of the member states of the Holy Roman Empire. The fortunes of war would shift back and forth several times. After its defeat in the Battle of Nördlingen (1634), confidence in Sweden among the Swedish-controlled German states was damaged, and several of the provinces refused further Swedish military support, leaving Sweden with only a couple of northern German provinces. After France intervened on the same side as Sweden, fortunes shifted again. As the war continued, the civilian and military death toll grew, and when it was over, it had led to severe depopulation in the German states. Although exact population estimates do not exist, historians estimate that the population of the Holy Roman Empire fell by one-third as a result of the war.

Sweden founded overseas colonies, principally in the New World. New Sweden was founded in the valley of the Delaware River in 1638, and Sweden later laid claim to a number of Caribbean islands. A string of Swedish forts and trading posts was constructed along the coast of West Africa as well, but these were not designed for Swedish settlers.

==== Peace of Westphalia ====
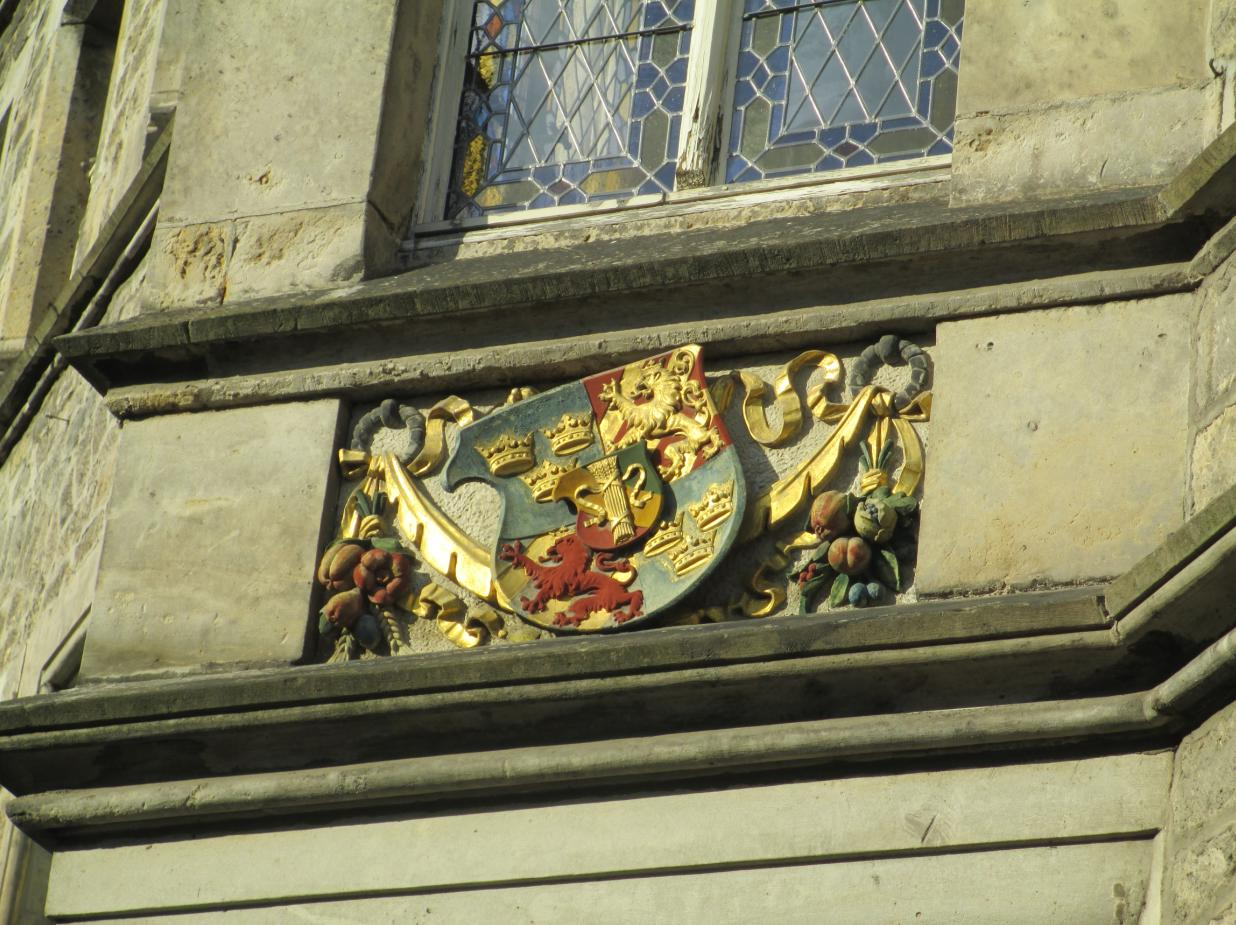
Sweden's coat of arms (with erroneous tinctures) on the wall of the Town Hall of Lützen in Germany.

At the conclusion of the Thirty Years' War, the Peace of Westphalia (1648) granted Sweden territories as war reparations. Sweden demanded Silesia, Pomerania (which had been in its possession since the Treaty of Stettin (1630)), and a war indemnity of 20,000,000 Riksdaler.

Through the efforts of Johan Oxenstierna and Johan Adler Salvius it obtained:

- Swedish Pomerania, the Swedish share of the former Duchy of Pomerania since the Treaty of Stettin in 1653, consisting of
  - Western Pomerania, with the islands of Rügen, Usedom and Wollin, as well as the towns of Stettin, Greifswald, and Stralsund;
  - a strip of Farther Pomerania on the right side of the Oder, including the towns of Damm and Gollnow, with the right of succession to the rest of Farther Pomerania in the case of the extinction of the Brandenburg Hohenzollerns;
- the town of Wismar, with the districts of Pod and Neukloster;
- the secularized bishoprics of Bremen-Verden, with the town of Wildeshausen; and
- 5,000,000 Riksdaler.

These German possessions were to be held as fiefs of the Holy Roman Empire. This allowed Sweden a vote in the Imperial Diet and enabled it to "direct" the Lower Saxon Circle alternately with Brandenburg. France and Sweden, moreover, became joint guarantors of the treaty with the Holy Roman Emperor and were entrusted with carrying out its provisions, as enacted by the executive congress of Nuremberg in 1650.

After the peaces of Brömsebro and Westphalia, Sweden was the third-largest area of control in Europe by land area, only surpassed by Russia and Spain. Sweden reached its largest territorial extent during this time under the rule of Charles X Gustav (1654–1660) after the Treaty of Roskilde in 1658.

=== Domestic consolidation ===
For the moment, Sweden held a tenuous position of leadership. Careful statesmanship might mean permanent dominion on the Baltic shore, but left little room for mistakes. The extravagance of Gustavus Adolphus's two immediate successors, Christina and Charles X Gustav, caused great difficulties for the new empire.

Christina's financial extravagance brought the state to the verge of bankruptcy, and the financial difficulties caused public unrest before her abdication. The Swedish people feared that the external, artificial greatness of their country might be purchased with the loss of their civil and political liberties. The Swedish people looked to a new king to address the problem of too much power vested in the nobility.

Charles X Gustav was a strong arbiter between the people and the nobility. Primarily a soldier, he directed his ambition towards military glory; but he was also an unusually sharp-sighted politician. While placing great emphasis on military strength, he also understood that domestic unity was necessary for a powerful foreign policy.

The most pressing domestic question was the reduction, or restitution of alienated crown lands. At the Riksdag of the Estates of 1655, the king proposed that noble holders of crown property should either: 1) pay an annual sum of 200,000 Riksdaler out of the lands they would receive, or 2) surrender a fourth of the property itself, worth approximately 800,000 Riksdaler. The nobility wished to avoid taxation and stipulated that 6 November 1632, the day of Gustavus Adolphus' death, should be the limit to which retrospective taxes could be collected, and that there should be no further restitution of alienated crown property. Against this, the over-taxed lower estates protested, and the Diet had to be suspended. The king intervened, not to quell the commons, as the senate insisted, but to compel the nobility to give way. He proposed a special committee to investigate the matter before the meeting of the next Riksdag and that a proportional contribution should be levied on all classes in the meantime. Both groups accepted this arrangement.

The interests of the high nobility contrasted with the uniformity policy (i.e., upholding the traditional equality in status of the Swedish estates favoured by the kings and peasantry). In territories acquired during the periods of de facto noble rule, serfdom was not abolished, and there was also a trend to set up respective estates in Sweden proper. The Great Reduction of 1680 put an end to these efforts of the nobility and required them to return estates once gained from the crown to the king. Serfdom, however, remained in force in the dominions acquired in the Holy Roman Empire and in Swedish Estonia, where a consequent application of the uniformity policy was hindered by the treaties by which they were gained.

Charles X Gustav had done his best to recover from the financial extravagance of Christina. However, his own desire for military glory may have caused problems for his country. In three days, he persuaded the Swedish estates of the potential of his attack on the Polish–Lithuanian Commonwealth. However, when he left Stockholm for Warsaw on 10 July 1654, he gained more personal glory than advantage for his country. The Polish-Swedish War expanded into a general European war. He achieved passage over the Belts and emerged triumphant, only to die of sheer exhaustion. Immediately after his death, a regency was appointed to govern Sweden during the minority of his only son and successor, Charles XI of Sweden, who was four years old. The regency council moved quickly to end the war with Sweden's numerous enemies, which now included the Tsardom of Russia, the Polish–Lithuanian Commonwealth, the Electorate of Brandenburg and Denmark-Norway.

=== Treaty of Roskilde and Peace of Oliva ===
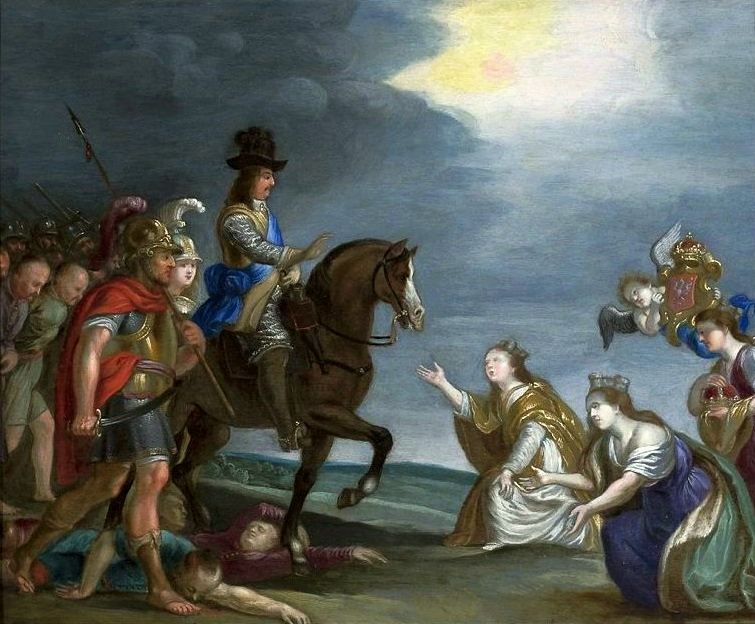
Triumph of King Charles X Gustav over the Polish–Lithuanian Commonwealth, 1655

After a Swedish war against Denmark–Norway, the Treaty of Roskilde in 1658 forced Denmark–Norway to cede Blekinge, Bornholm, Bohuslän, Scania and Trøndelag, as well as Halland to Sweden. The Peace of Oliva on 3 May 1660, put an end to the long feud with Poland. French mediation of this treaty also ended the quarrel between Sweden, the Holy Roman emperor and the elector of Brandenburg. This treaty confirmed both Sweden's possession of Livonia and the elector of Brandenburg's sovereignty over Prussia; and the king of Polish–Lithuanian Commonwealth renounced to all claims to the Swedish crown. The treaty compelled Denmark–Norway to reopen direct negotiations with Sweden. Eventually, under the Treaty of Copenhagen on 27 May 1660, Sweden kept the three formerly Danish Scanian provinces and the formerly Norwegian Bohuslän province, which Denmark-Norway had surrendered by the Treaty of Roskilde two years previously; but Sweden had to relinquish the Norwegian province of Trøndelag and the Danish island of Bornholm, which had been surrendered at Roskilde. Denmark–Norway was also compelled to recognize the independence of the dukes of Holstein-Gottorp. The Russo-Swedish War (1656–1658) was terminated by the Treaty of Cardis on 2 July 1661, through which the Tsar surrendered the Baltic provinces to Sweden — Ingria, Estonia and Kexholm.

Thus, Sweden emerged from the war not only a military power, but also one of the largest states of Europe, possessing more than twice as much territory as modern Sweden. The land area of Sweden was 1,100,000 km^{2}. While modern Sweden is bounded by the Baltic, during the 17th century the Baltic formed a bond between various widely dispersed dominions. All the islands in the Baltic, except the Danish group, belonged to Sweden. The estuaries of all the great German rivers lay within Swedish territory, which also included two-thirds of Lake Ladoga and one-half of Lake Peipus. Stockholm, the capital, lay in the very centre of the empire, whose second greatest city was Riga, on the other side of the sea. This empire contained about a quarter of the population of modern Sweden, at only 2,500,000 people, or about 2.3 people per square kilometer. However, Sweden's expansion had been possible partly due to turmoil and weakness in countries in its vicinity, and when they became more stable, they began to look for chances to regain what was lost.

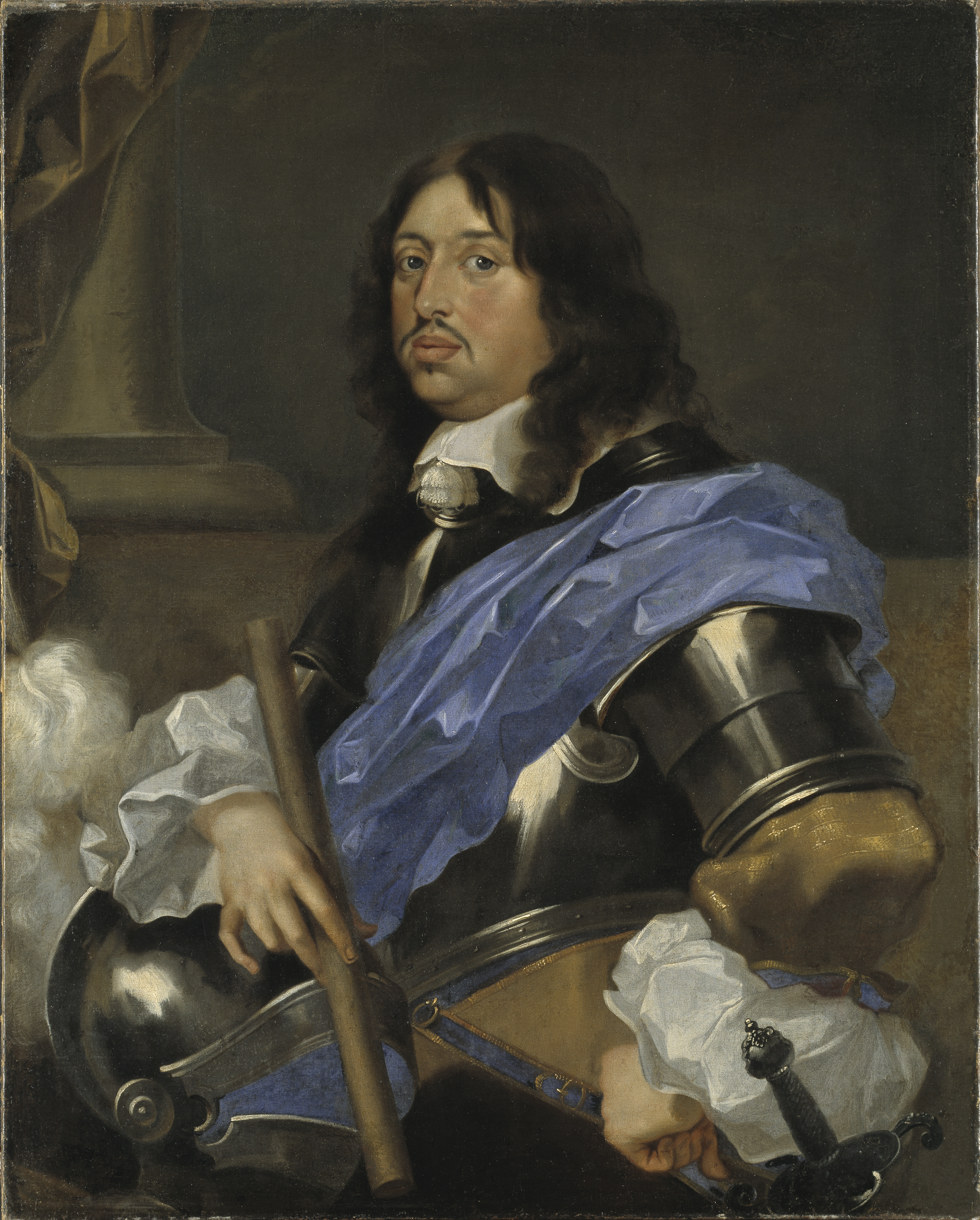
King Charles X Gustav

Sweden had now won considerable political influence, which was lessened by the loss of moral prestige. On Charles X Gustav's accession in 1655, Sweden's neighbours may have become allies; however, territorial loss combined with the loss of religious liberty lessened their ties to Sweden. At Charles X Gustav's death, five years later, Sweden had not only damaged its newly claimed territories but also had become hated by the surrounding states for its lack of defence of Protestantism. Charles X Gustav's attempt to gain the favour of Brandenburg by dividing Poland not only reversed his original policy, but also created a new southern rival almost as dangerous as Denmark–Norway in the west.

In 1660, after five years of warfare, Sweden had obtained peace and the opportunity to organize and develop the new vast realm. The fifteen-year regency that followed Charles X Gustav was unable to manoeuvre through the situation it faced. The administration was internally divided and hindered by the lack of unity and talent among its statesmen. The two major rivals were the military-aristocratic party headed by Magnus de la Gardie and the party of peace and economy led by Johan Gyllenstierna. The aristocratic group prevailed and brought with it a decline of morality which made it notorious to its neighbours. The administration was noted for sloth and carelessness leading to a general neglect of business. Additionally, government corruption led Sweden to be hired by foreign powers. This "subsidy policy" dates from the Treaty of Fontainebleau of 1661, through which Sweden, in exchange for a considerable sum of money, supported the French candidate for the Polish throne. Sweden was torn between Louis XIV of France and his adversaries in plans to control the Spanish Netherlands. The anti-French faction prevailed; and in April 1668, Sweden acceded to the Triple Alliance, which ended the French acquisitions through the Treaty of Aix-la-Chapelle. For the next four years, Sweden remained true to the Triple Alliance; but, in 1672, Louis XIV succeeded in isolating the Dutch Republic and regaining Sweden as an ally. By the Treaty of Stockholm (14 April 1672), Sweden entered an agreement with the French to protect its sphere of interest containing the Dutch Republic from hostile German claims in return for 400,000 Riksdaler per annum in peace and 600,000 in wartime.

=== Scanian War ===
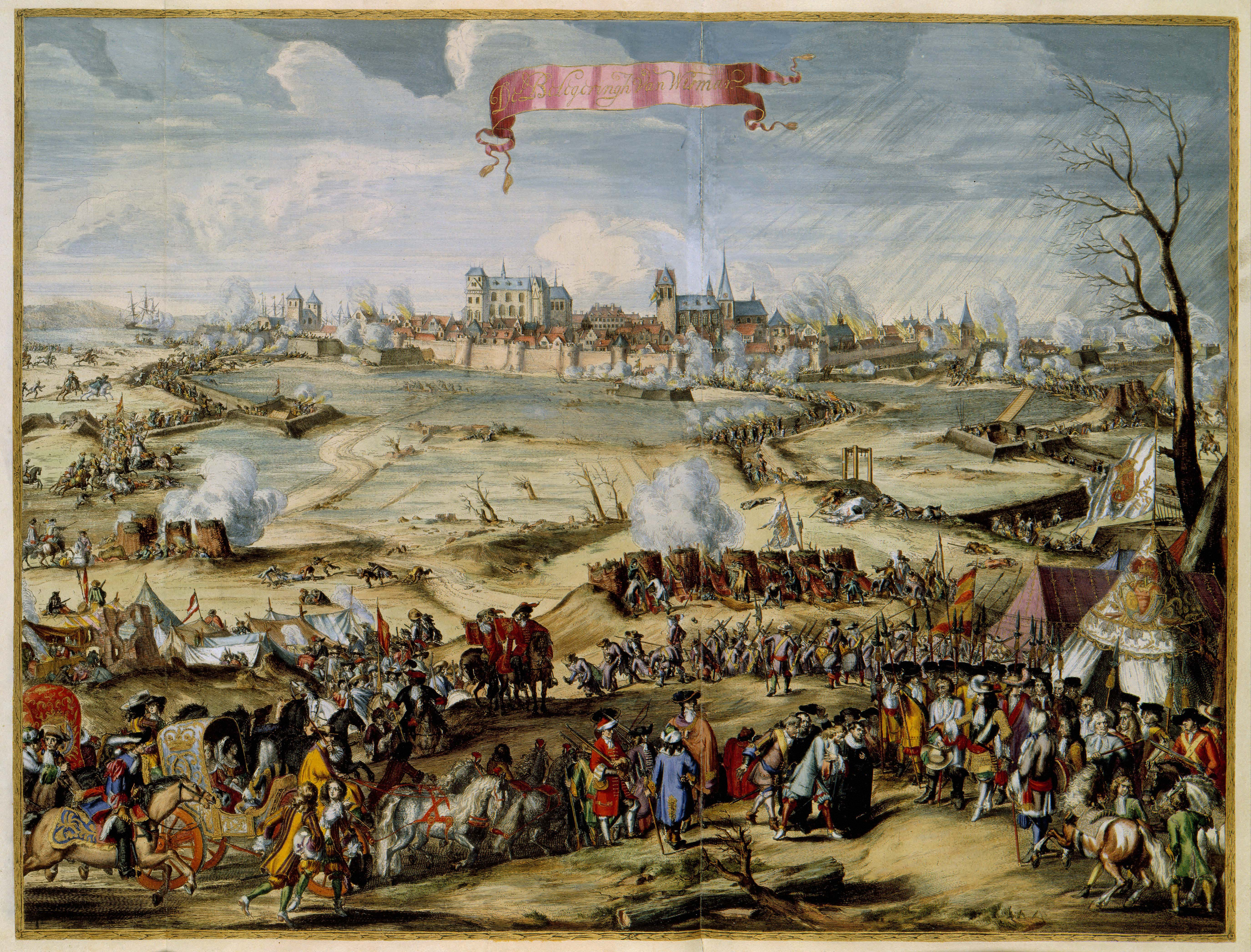
Siege of Wismar in 1675

In 1674, Louis XIV called upon Sweden to invade the Electorate of Brandenburg. In May 1675, a Swedish army advanced into the Mark but was defeated on 18 June at Fehrbellin and retreated to Swedish Demmin. The Fehrbellin affair was a mere skirmish, with actual casualties numbering fewer than 600 men, but it made Sweden appear vulnerable and enabled neighbouring countries to attack in the Scanian War.

At this point, the empire began to crumble. In 1675, Swedish Pomerania and the Duchy of Bremen were taken by the Brandenburgers, Austrians, and Danes. In December 1677, the elector of Brandenburg captured Stettin. Stralsund fell on 15 October 1678. Greifswald, Sweden's last possession on the continent, was lost on 5 November. A defensive alliance with John III Sobieski of Poland was rendered inoperative on 4 August 1677, by the annihilation of Sweden's sea-power; the Battle of Öland, 17 June 1676; the Battle of Fehmarn, June 1677, and most notable on 1–2 July the Battle of Køge Bay. The difficulties concerning the Polish king continued. The Scanian provinces (Scania, Halland and Blegind/Blekinge), once eastern Denmark, became the centre of intense fighting between Swedes and Danes, with a large scale confrontation between the main armies near Lund in December 1676. After the Swedish victory at the Battle of Lund, Scania was divided into Danish and Swedish enclaves centering around the main cities for the rest of the war. The remaining territories in Scania were mainly a no man's land where a fierce "little war" took place, with Swedish troops on the one side and Danish official and semi-official troops (freeshooters etc.) in conjunction with armed locals.

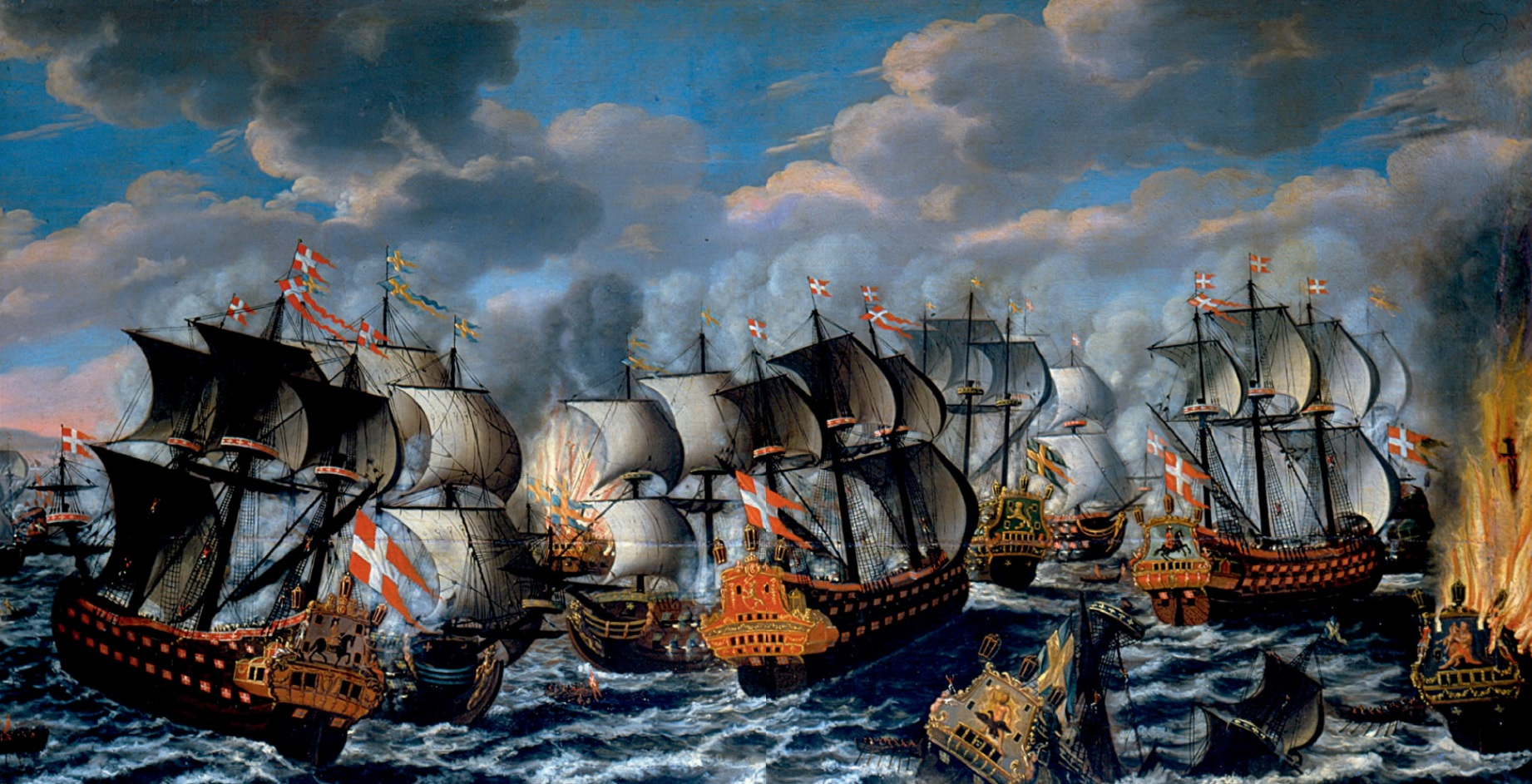
Battle of Køge Bay in 1677

Through homeland military successes of the young Swedish king and the diplomatic activity of Louis XIV, a peace congress began sessions at Nijmegen in March 1677. In the beginning of April 1678, the French king dictated the terms of a peace. One of his chief conditions was the complete restitution of Sweden, as he needed a strong Swedish ally. However, Charles XI refused to go along with ceding territories to its enemies, which led the French king to negotiate on behalf of Sweden without its consent. By the Treaties of Nijmegen on 7 February and of St. Germain on 29 June 1679, Sweden received almost full restitution of its German territory. By the Treaty of Fontainebleau confirmed by the subsequent Peace of Lund on 2 September, Denmark–Norway was to return all the land it had captured to Sweden on 4 October 1679. While Sweden could never have gained these concessions alone, Charles XI formed a personal dislike of the French king and developed a strong anti-French bias.

=== Charles XI ===
The remainder of the reign of Charles XI is remarkable for a revolution, in which the government of Sweden was transformed to a semi-absolute monarchy. The king emerged from the war convinced that if Sweden were to retain its position as a great power, it needed to reform its whole economic system radically and circumscribe the power of the aristocracy. Charles XI felt that he could do it now that he had allies in the lower orders to support him.

The Riksdag of Stockholm, October 1680, began a new era of Swedish history. On the motion of the Estate of Peasants, the question of the recovery of the alienated crown lands was brought before the Riksdag, and a resolution of the Diet directed that all countships, baronies, domains, manors and other estates producing an annual rent of more than a certain amount per annum should revert to the Crown. The same Riksdag decided that the king was not bound by any particular constitution, but only by law and statutes, and not even obligated to consult the Privy Council, but was to be regarded as a sovereign lord. The Privy Council changed its official title from Riksråd (council of state) to kungligt råd (royal council); a visible sign that the councilors were no longer the king's colleagues, but rather his servants.

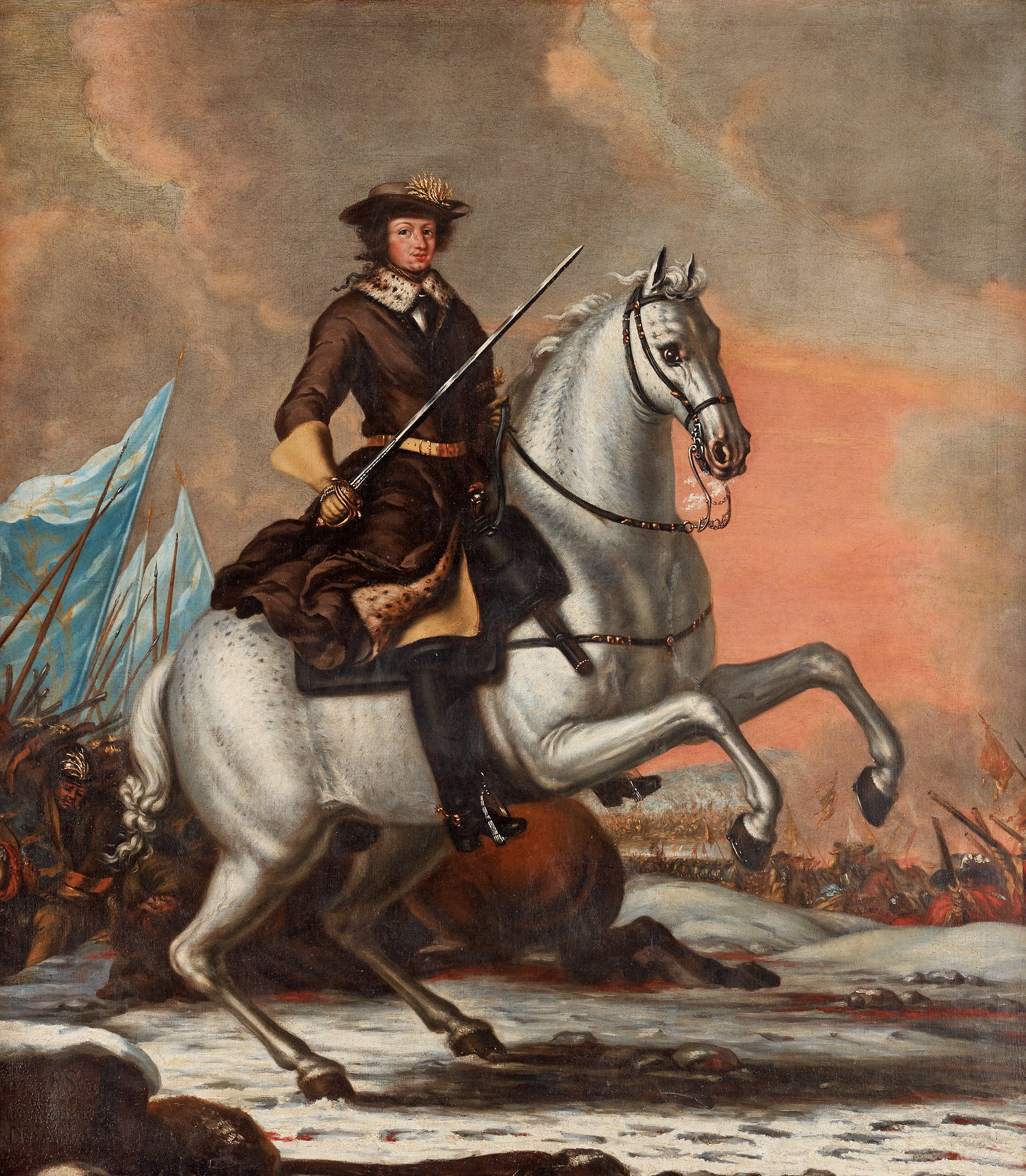
King Charles XI

Thus, Sweden had become an absolute monarchy but enacted the right of the Swedish people, in parliament, to be consulted on all important matters. The Riksdag, completely overshadowed by the Crown, did little more than register the royal decrees during the reign of Charles XI of Sweden; but it continued to exist as an essential part of the government. Moreover, this transfer of authority was a voluntary act. The people, knowing the king to be their ally, trusted and cooperated with him. The Riksdag of 1682 declared that the king was empowered to bestow fiefs and take them back again, making the king the disposer of his subjects' temporal property. Presently, this new principle of autocracy was extended to the king's legislative authority, when on 9 December 1682, all four estates not only confirmed that the king held the legislative powers enjoyed by his predecessors, but even gave him the right of interpreting and amending the common law.

The recovery of the alienated crown lands occupied Charles XI for the rest of his life. He created a commission, which was ultimately converted into a permanent department of state. It acted on the principle that the titles of all private landed estates might be called in question, because at some time or other they must have belonged to the Crown, and the burden of proof of ownership lay with the actual owner of the property, not the Crown. The amount of revenue accruing to the Crown from the whole "Reduktion" is impossible to estimate; but by these means, combined with careful management and rigid economy, Charles XI reduced the national debt by three quarters.

Charles XI re-established on a broader basis the reorganization of the "indelningsverk" — a system of military tenure in which national forces were bound to the soil. This tied to the "rust hail tenure", under which the tenants, instead of paying rent, were obliged to equip and maintain a cavalry soldier and horse; while the knekthållare supplied duly equipped foot soldiers. Soldiers were provided with holdings on which they lived in times of peace. Formerly, ordinary conscription had existed alongside this indelning, or distribution system, but it had proved inadequate as well as highly unpopular, and in 1682, Charles XI ended it in favor of an extended distribution system. The Swedish Royal Navy was entirely remodeled; and, the recent war having demonstrated the unsuitability of Stockholm as a naval station, the construction of a new arsenal was begun at Karlskrona. After seventeen years of financial difficulties, the twofold enterprise was completed. At the death of Charles XI, Sweden could boast of a fleet of forty-three three-deckers, manned by 11,000 men and armed with 2,648 guns, and one of the finest arsenals in the world.

=== Charles XII and the Great Northern War ===
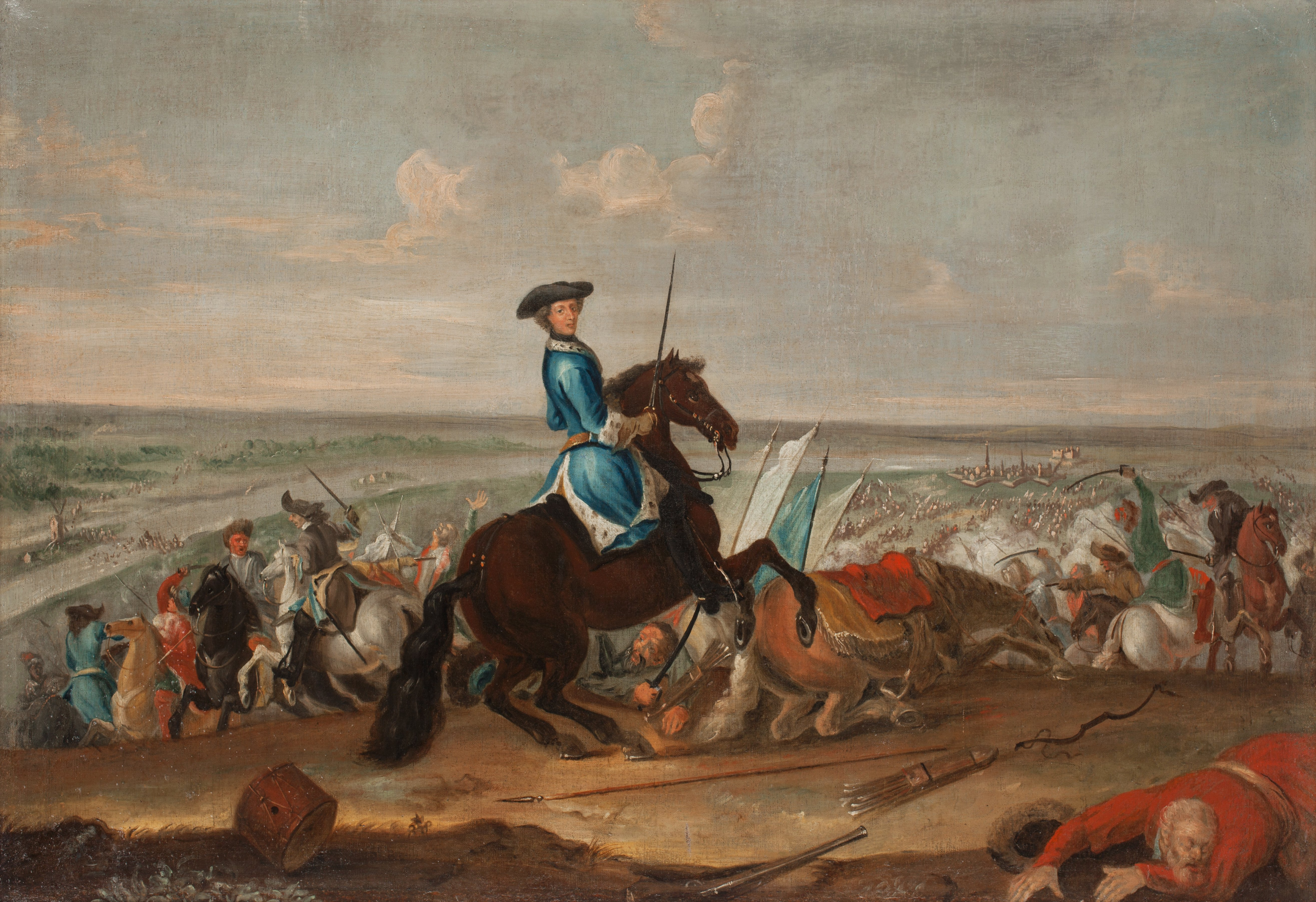
Charles XII at the Battle of Narva

After Charles XI's death, the throne was inherited by his underage son, Charles XII. After a brief regency, he was declared to be of age to rule. Three years later, in 1700, Denmark–Norway, Poland and Russia, the countries that had lost the most territory to Sweden, jointly declared war. Denmark–Norway was soon forced to peace after a joint intervention of Swedish, English and Dutch armies, whereafter the King and much of the Swedish army was shipped to the Baltic provinces, where Russian and Polish armies were laying siege to several towns. The Russian army was soundly defeated in the Battle of Narva, after which Charles took the army into Poland with the intent of dethroning the Polish king Augustus II. This took several years, but in 1706, with the Treaty of Altranstädt, he reached his goal.

In the meantime, Russia had managed to take possession of several towns by the Baltic Sea. Instead of trying to retake these, Charles chose to march directly on Moscow, but due to extreme weather, difficulties with his supply lines and the Russian scorched earth strategy, he was forced to turn towards Ukraine. In 1709, the Swedish army was defeated and captured in the Battle of Poltava; Charles managed to escape south to Bender in the Ottoman Empire. Following the defeat at Poltava, Poland and Denmark re-entered the war, along with other countries wanting parts of the Swedish provinces. In the following years, most of them would fall, and Russia occupied the eastern half of Sweden (present-day Finland).

Despite these setbacks, Charles XII twice tried to invade Norway to force Denmark-Norway out of the war again. On 30 November 1718, King Charles XII was mortally wounded during the siege of Fredriksten Fortress in Fredrikshald, today's Halden. With his death, Swedish war efforts mostly came to a halt, although Russia continued to harass the civilian population of the Swedish coastal areas until the concluding Treaty of Nystad was finally signed in 1721. Sweden would remain a regional power of varying success until the 19th century, but the Great Northern War put an end to Sweden's time as a great power.

== Dominions ==
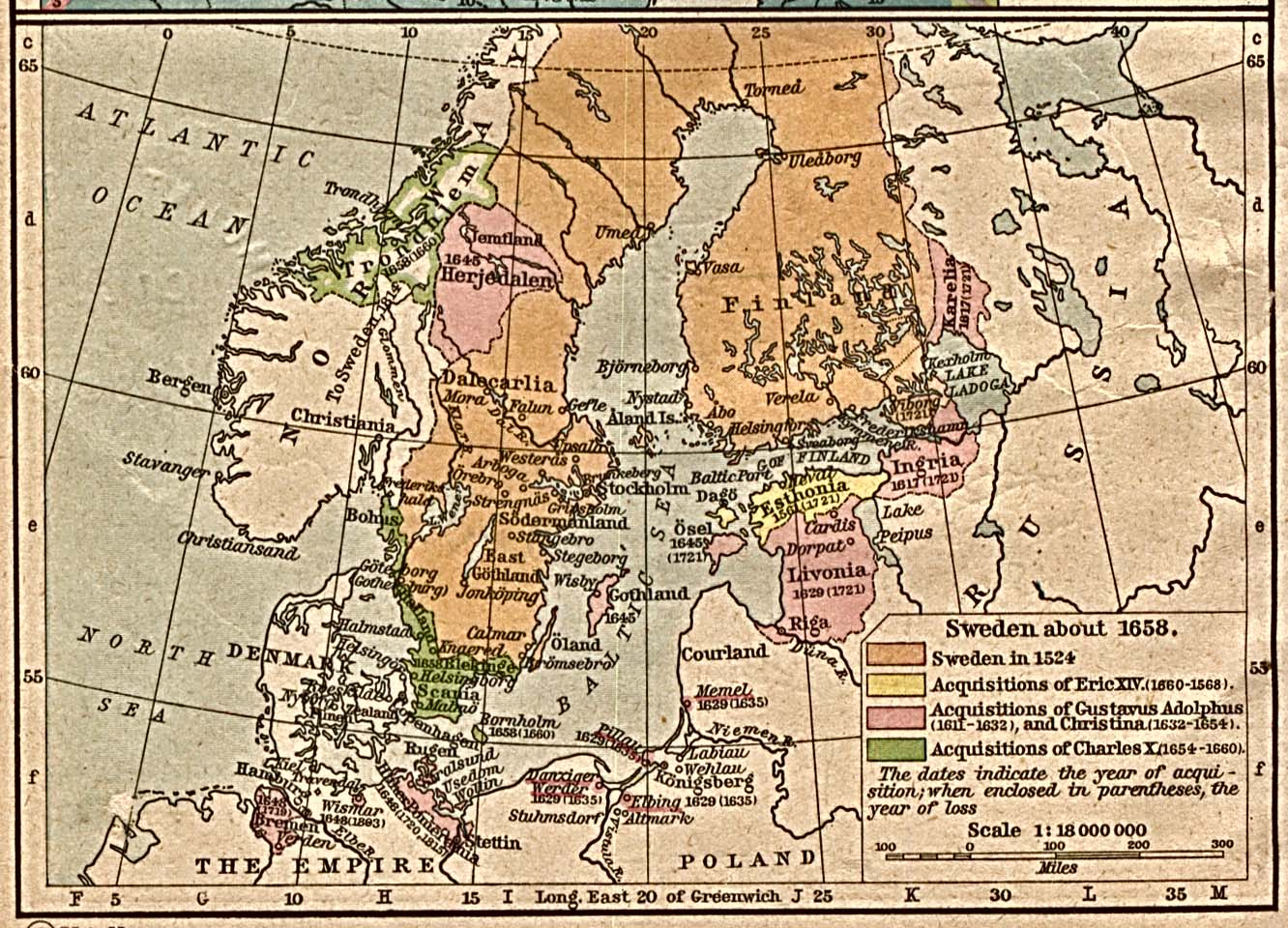
1923 map showing Swedish possessions acquired between 1524 and 1658. Years in parentheses show when possession was lost.

As a result of eighteen years of war, Sweden gained small and scattered possessions, but had secured control of three principal rivers in northern Germany—the Oder, the Elbe and the Weser—and gained toll-collection rights for those important commercial arteries, benefitting the Swedish economy. Two principal reasons for the small reparations were France's envy and Queen Christina's impatience. As a result of Sweden's intervention, Sweden helped secure religious liberty in Europe for Protestants, becoming a leading power of Continental Protestantism for 90 years. The elevation of Sweden to the rank of an imperial power required that it remain a military monarchy, armed for possible emergency. Sweden's poverty and sparse population meant the country was ill-suited for imperial status. However, in the middle of the 17th century, with France as a firm ally, the incompatibility between its powers and its pretensions was not so obvious.

== Military history ==
A major reason why Sweden could be so successful in wars with such a scarce number of soldiers was its advanced military tactics. Sweden was able to reform its military tactics continuously throughout the period. Prior to Gustavus Adolphus's reforms, both his father, Charles IX, and his uncle Erik XIV had tried to reform the army but had effectively failed to do so. Charles IX, like most other rulers, had tried to implement the Dutch system into the army but with limited success. The lack of a strict organisation in the infantry caused the proportion of pikemen to musketeers to be far lower than the preferred ratio of 1 to 1. This, combined with the lack of funds to provide the soldiers with armour, caused the Swedish infantry to be dangerously lightly equipped and unable to deal with cavalry or heavier infantry in open terrain. Charles IX was, however, able to implement the Dutch system for fighting in caracole among the cavalry, with unfortunate results. His partially reformed army suffered a disastrous defeat at Kircholm against a Polish-Lithuanian army led by Jan Karol Chodkiewicz. Charles IX's revolt against his nephew Sigismund (who had inherited the throne of both Sweden and Poland) and subsequent rise to the throne of Sweden caused a dynastic struggle for the throne of Sweden that would not finally end until the treaty of Oliva in 1660.

Gustav II Adolph inherited the Polish war together with the Kalmar War against Denmark–Norway when Charles IX died in 1611. The war against Denmark–Norway was a terrible loss that forced Sweden to pay a ransom of 1 million silverdaler to regain Älvsborg (final payment, 1619). The Polish war was interrupted by a series of truces caused by Sweden's weakness along with the unwillingness of the Polish nobility to fight a war considered only to be in Sigismunds personal interest. The costly peace with Denmark and Poland–Lithuania's inability to mount a seaborne attack on the Swedish mainland gave time for Gustavus Adolphus to reform his armies. The continuation of the Polish war in 1625–1629 ended with a ceasefire in Stary Targ (Truce of Altmark) on 26 September 1629 that was in favour of the Swedes, to whom Poland ceded the larger part of Livonia together with its important port of Riga. The Swedes also got the right to tax Poland's trade on the Baltic (3.5% on the value of goods), and kept control of many of the cities in Royal and Ducal Prussia (including Piława (Pillau), Memel and Elbląg (Elbing). The Swedes later conducted a series of invasions into the Polish–Lithuanian Commonwealth, known as the Deluge.

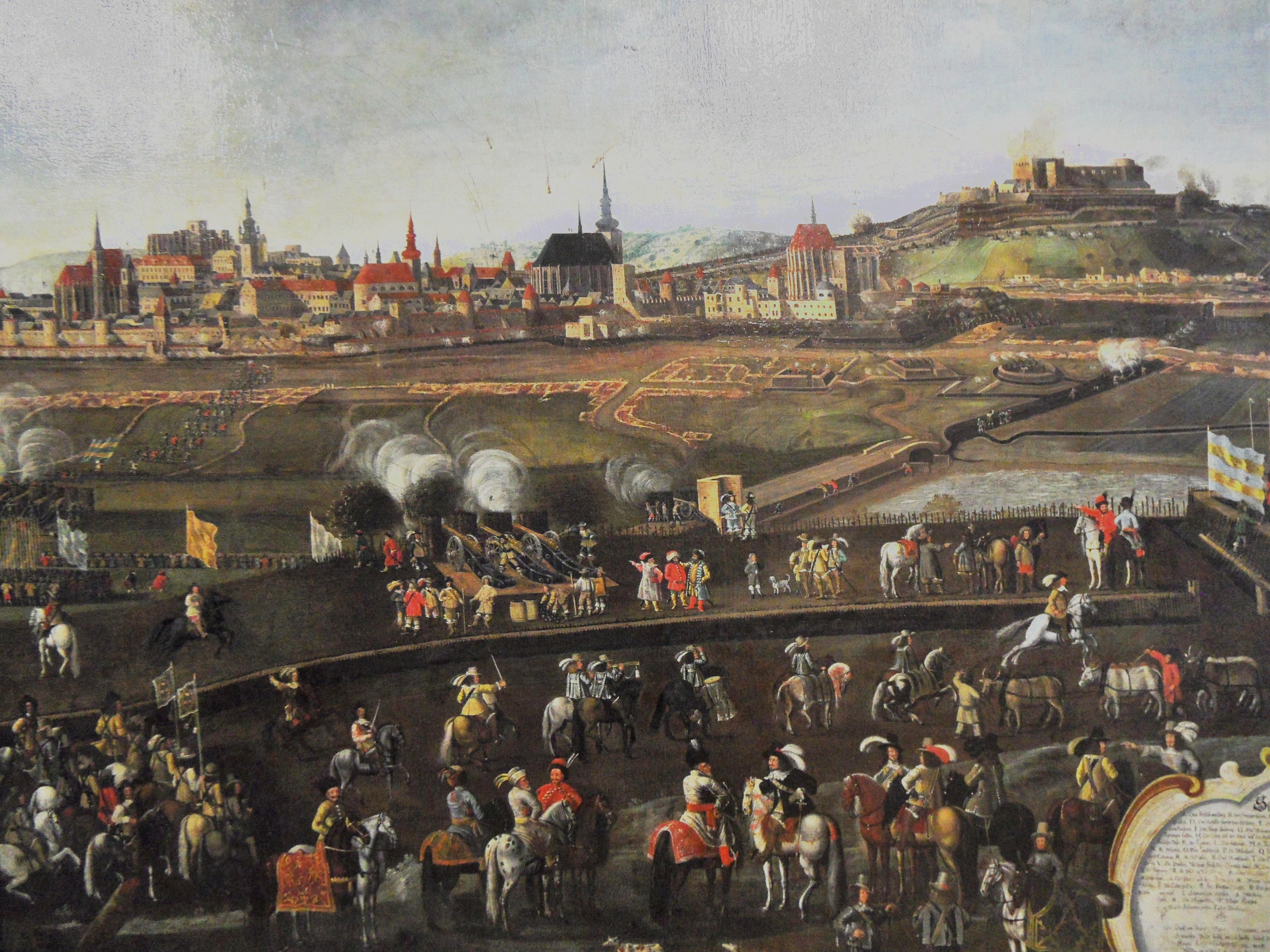
Siege of Brno in 1645 by Swedish and Transylvanian forces led by Lennart Torstenson

By the time of the Swedish Intervention in the Thirty Years' War in 1630, Gustav II Adolph had transformed the Swedish (Gustavian) army into an army in which the cavalry fought with aggressive shock tactics, closer to the Polish tactics than the Western European. The Caracole and heavy armor were mostly abandoned, and the saber replaced the wheellock pistol as the primary weapon of the cavalry. Horsemen rode knee-by-knee in a tight formation. When in range, they switched to gallop and charged, and at a range of ten yards, shot both their pistols. A standard regiment numbered 250 simultaneous shots that would blast a hole in the enemy ranks. They then continued the charge with sabres (värjor), aiming to break the enemy formation. The infantry was meanwhile employed in a defensive manner, relying on their superior firepower to break enemy attacks. Smaller musketeer detachments (~200 men) were used during the Polish war to support the cavalry against the superior Polish-Lithuanian cavalry. Gustavus Adolphus earned the title "father of modern warfare" because of his revolutionary tactics during the Thirty Years' War, which later inspired other nations and became standard tactics. He became the foremost model of many later Swedish kings.

At the time Finns were an essential part of the Swedish military. Roughly 2/5 of the infantry and 3/7 of the cavalry in the army were from Finland. They served in their own units which used Finnish as their main language. Commands were also given in Finnish. The Finnish cavalry in the Swedish army was called Hakkapeliitat after their battle cry "Hakkaa päälle!". Approximately 110,000 soldiers from Finland died serving the Swedish Empire between 1617 and 1721. Relative to the contemporary population of Finland, this was equivalent to over a million of them dying in 20th-century Finland.

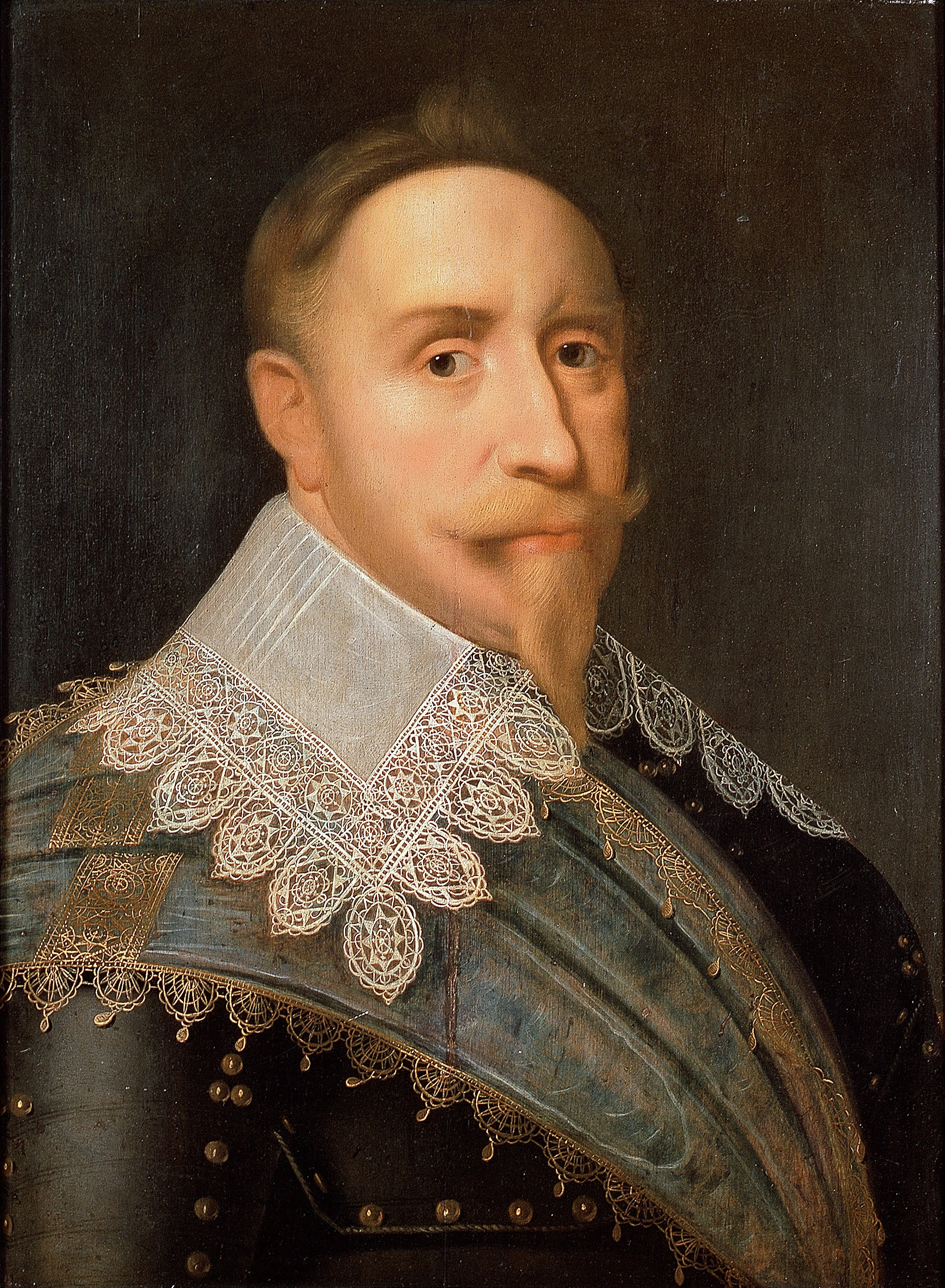
Gustavus Adolphus.

Throughout the Thirty Years' War, the infantry's shock ability was continuously improved. The static nature of the infantry that served well against the cavalry-dominated Polish-Lithuanian army was enhanced during the war to produce infantry capable of both providing devastating firepower and executing offensive maneuvers. Initially, at the Battle of Breitenfeld (1631), the infantry was almost entirely reliant on their firepower and saw very limited offensive use; but under the leadership of Johan Banér, who took command after the defeat at Nördlingen, the Gustavian brigade system was finally changed into the battalion system recognisable from the War of the Spanish Succession and the Great Northern War (the depth was lowered from six ranks to three or four when the bayonet was introduced at the end of the 17th century).

Swedish tactics once again greatly diverged from the continental tactics during the second half of the 17th century. The continental tactics increasingly emphasized the firepower of the battalion, while the Swedish (Carolean) tactics almost exclusively relied on the shock factor as the infantry and cavalry charged the enemy. As the bayonet was introduced, the pike was discarded in all armies except the Swedish and Russian by 1700.

In the Swedish army tactics of that time, retreat was never covered, and they were obliged to attack or fight where they stood. This was a military doctrine that (with the advantage of hindsight) might have proven a bit rash.

The infantry shock attack operated as follows. The two rear ranks of musketeers were ordered to shoot when "you could not miss," a range of roughly 50 meters, and then to draw their swords before the battalion resumed their attack. The two foremost ranks then discharged at a range of roughly 20 meters before drawing their swords, and the charge began. At this range, the powerful muskets usually felled many enemy troops and was demoralising to them. Directly after the volley, the Swedes charged the enemy ranks with pikes, bayonets and sabres. Note that the pikes were used as an offensive weapon: in close combat, they had the advantage over their foes' weapons thanks to their range. After the bayonet was introduced in the Carolean army (1700–1706), the final volley was delayed until the soldiers were inside bayonet range.

Every infantry battalion had grenadiers attached. They supported the infantry attack by lobbing grenades from the flanks. They also formed units of their own. They were otherwise equipped like infantry.

Thus, in the latter half of the 17th century, the major difference between the Swedish army and those common on the continent was the relative lack of firepower and the use of pikes and sabres. Sweden and Russia were the only countries at the time using pikes. In contemporary Europe, infantry were equipped with a musket, while in the Swedish army, every third man had a pike. The pikemen were normally deployed four men deep with musketeers of equal depth on the sides. The pike was used to repulse cavalry and to break the enemy lines as they charged.

== Gallery of the Swedish monarchs during the imperial era ==
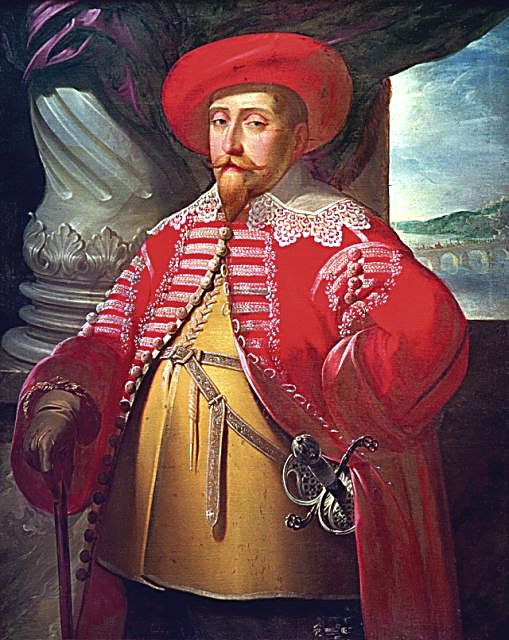
King Gustav II Adolph "Gustavus Adolphus"

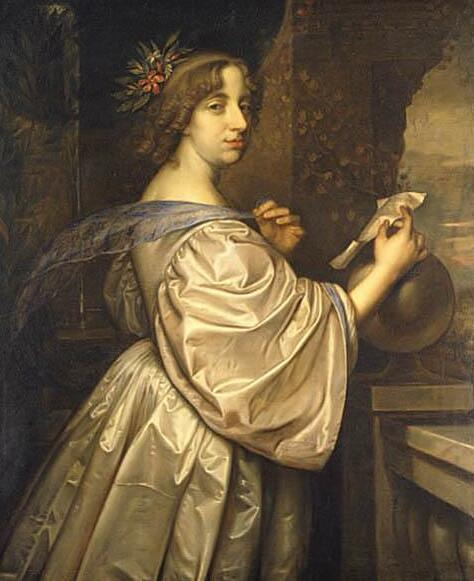
Queen Christina

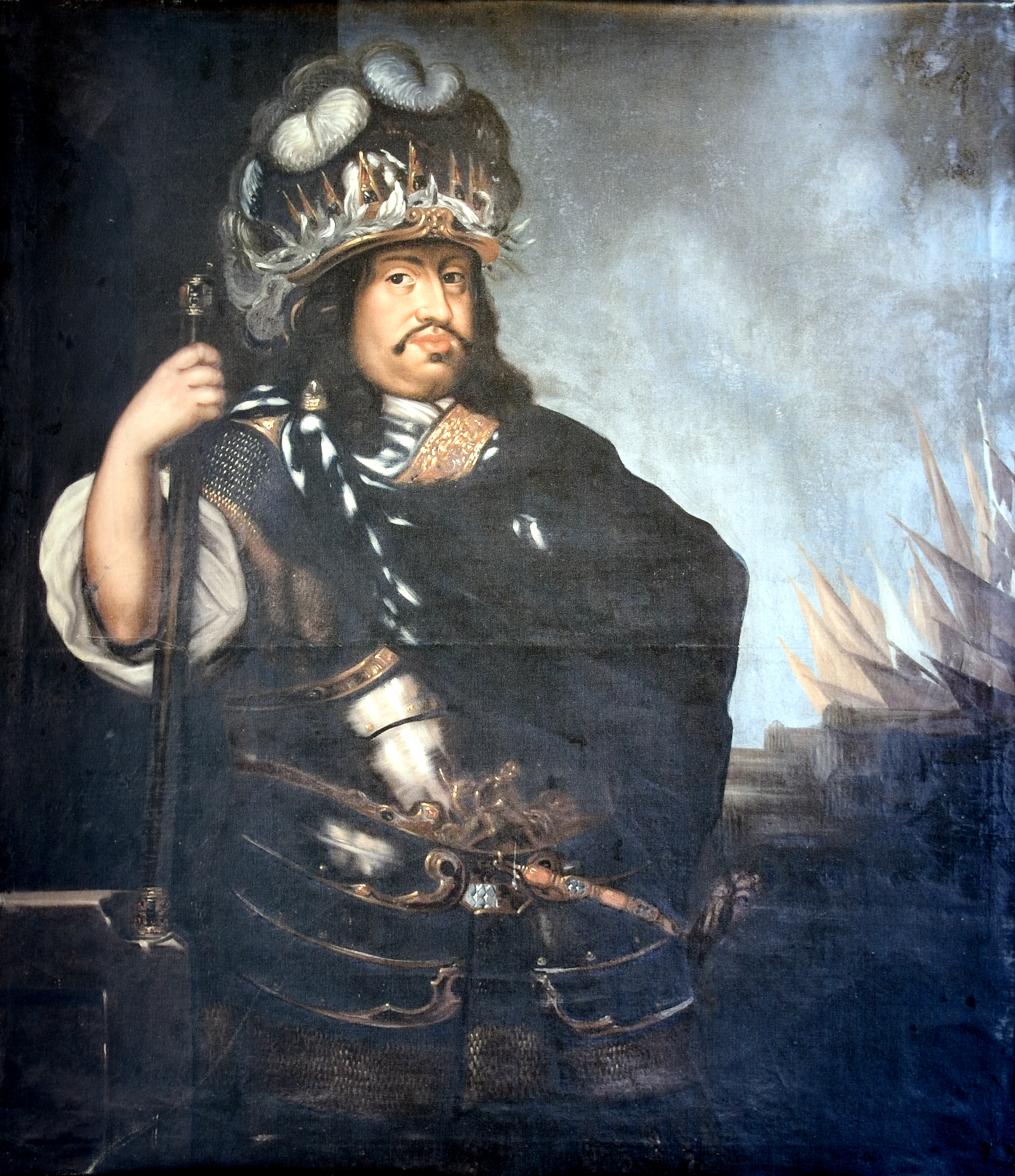
King Carl X Gustav

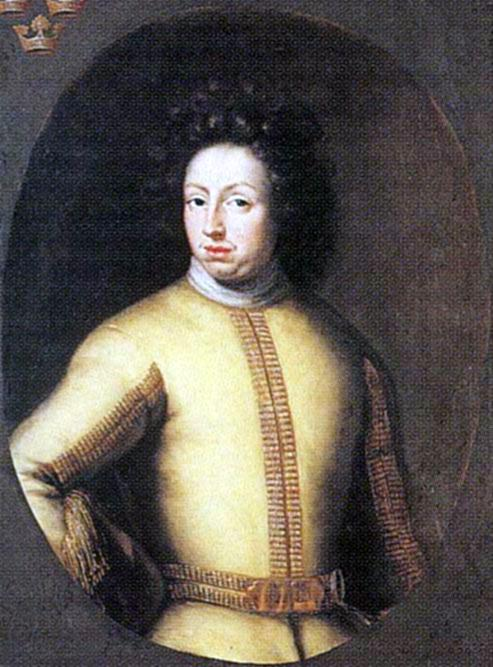
King Carl XI

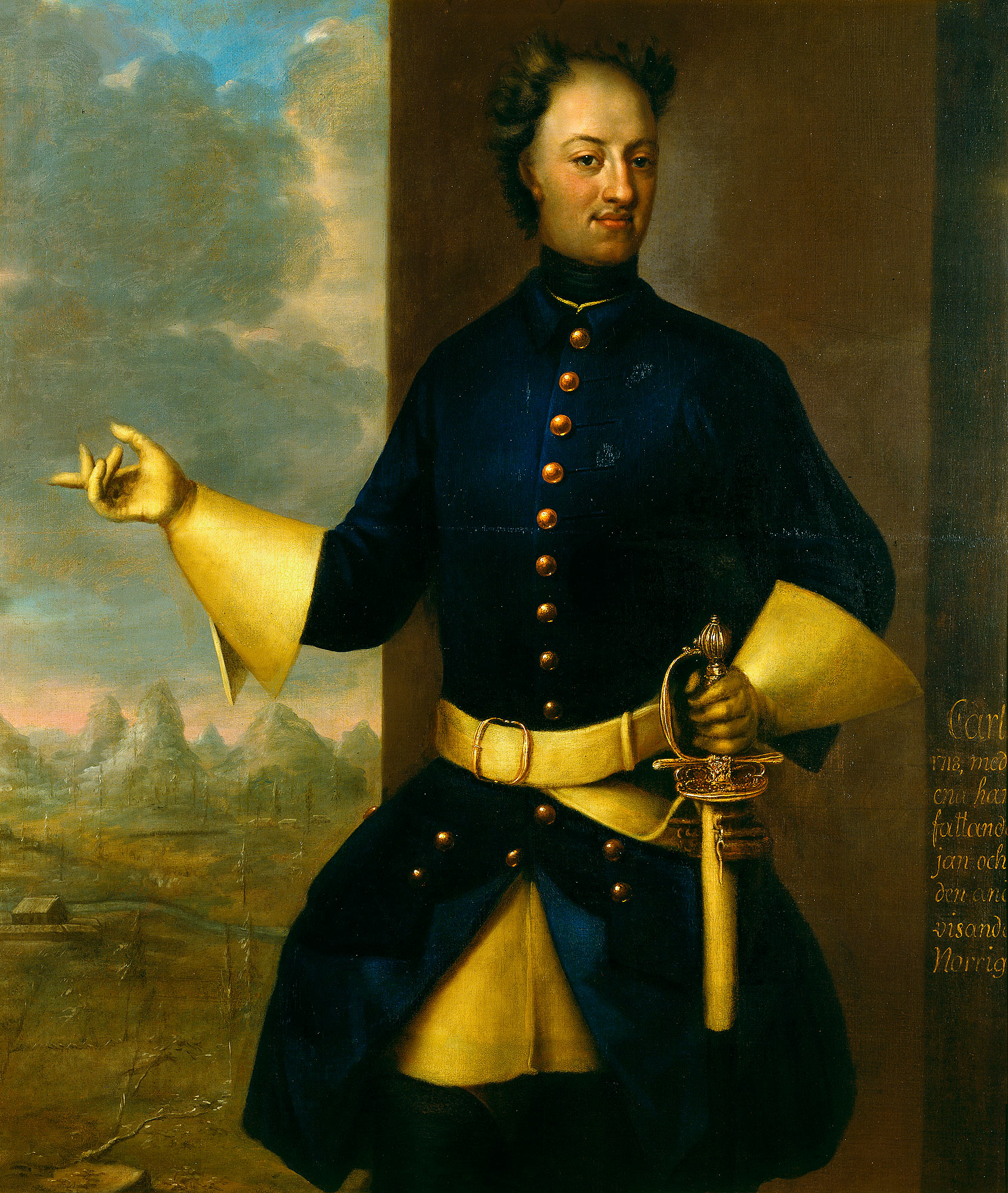
King Carl XII

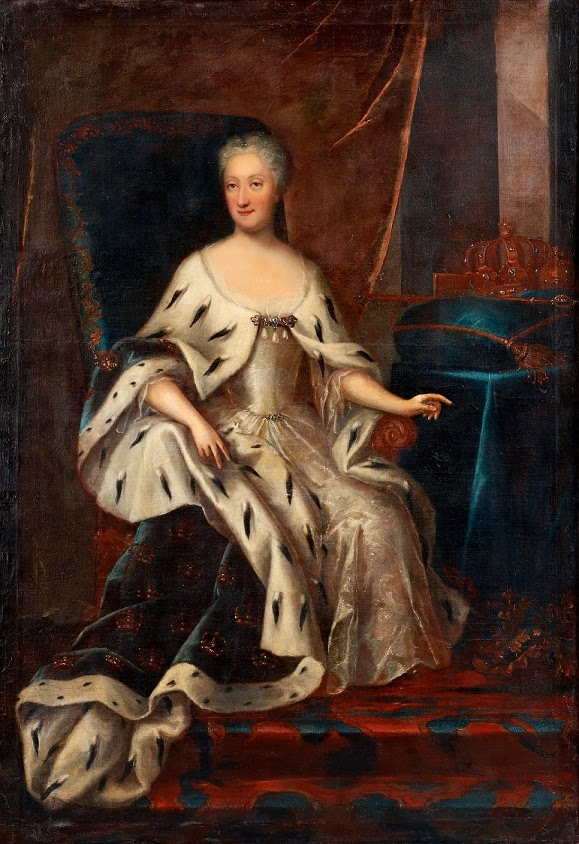
Queen Ulrika Eleonora

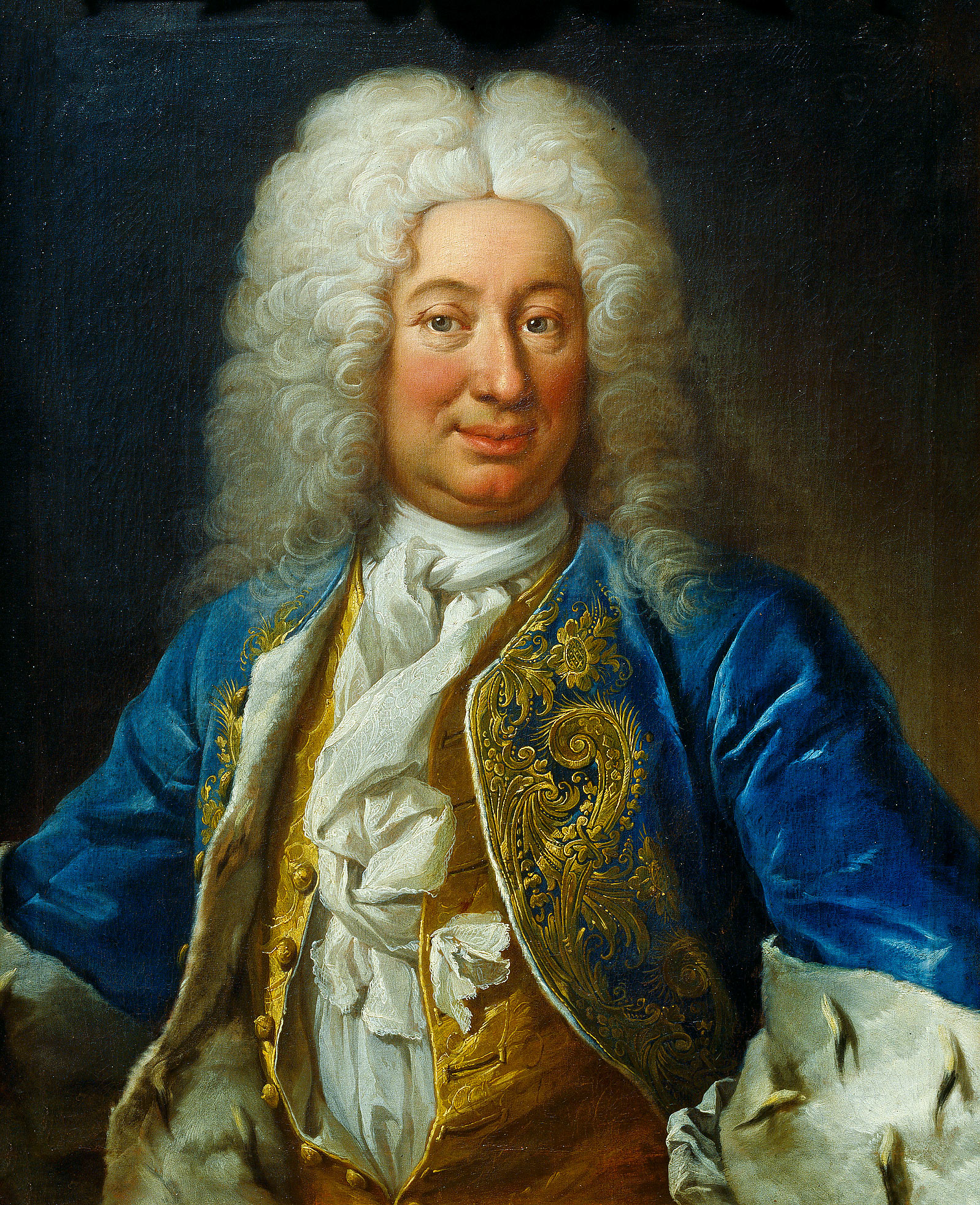
King Frederick I

== See also ==
- History of Denmark
- History of Estonia
- History of Finland
- History of Latvia
- History of Norway
- History of Pomerania
- Military of the Swedish Empire
- Swedish overseas colonies
