= Treaty of Stockholm (1672) =

Alliance treaty between France and Sweden

- Type: Alliance treaty
- Signed: April 14, 1672
- Location: Stockholm
- Signatories: (Kingdom of France) Louis XIV; (Swedish Empire) Charles XI
- Parties: Kingdom of France; (Swedish Empire) Sweden

The Treaty of Stockholm (1672) was an alliance treaty signed between Sweden and France on 14 April 1672.

== Stipulations ==
- France is to pay an annual subsidy of 400,000 Rixdollar during peacetimes and 600,000 Rixdollar in wartime to Sweden to support its army.
- Sweden is to support Louis XIV against any German prince who declares war against him.
- Sweden promises to maintain an army of at least 16,000 in Germany
