= Estonia under Swedish rule =

Period of Estonian history (1561–1710)

Coat of arms of Swedish Estonia (1660)

Estonia under Swedish rule signifies the period of time between 1561 and 1710, when present-day Estonia was under the rule of the Swedish Empire. In the wake of the breakup of the State of the Teutonic Order, the Baltic German local nobility in the areas of Harrien (Harjumaa) and Wierland (Virumaa), as well as the city of Reval (Tallinn) in June 1561 and somewhat later Jerwen (Järvamaa), asked for and were granted protection by the Swedish king Eric XIV, leading to Swedish involvement in the Livonian War. At the conclusion of hostilities in 1583, Sweden was in control of the northern parts of modern Estonia and Dagö (Hiiumaa island); the Duchy of Estonia was created from this territory. Following renewed wars between Poland and Sweden, the southern parts of present-day Estonia (then Livonia) were incorporated into Sweden by the Treaty of Altmark in 1629. Sweden also conquered the island of Ösel (Saaremaa) from Denmark, and were thus in control of all of present-day Estonia.

The time of Swedish rule came to an effective end in 1710, when all the Swedish Baltic provinces capitulated to Russian troops during the end-stages of the Great Northern War. Russian hegemony was formalized in 1721.

The reasons for Swedish involvement in Estonia were economic as well as political and military. The Swedish Crown was not least interested in getting a share of the profits from the rich trade with Russia. At the same time, assertions in Estonia can also be seen as a way of preventing Russia and Denmark from gaining potentially dangerous footholds close to Swedish-controlled Finland.

The time of Swedish rule is sometimes colloquially referred to as the "good old Swedish times" (Estonian: vana hea Rootsi aeg). However, it remains unclear whether the contemporaneous Estonian-speaking population generally used that expression or whether it considered the time of Swedish rule to be significantly better than that of earlier foreign rulers. Especially during the later part of the Swedish rule of Estonia, Swedish authorities, however, enact a number of reforms, which were aimed at lessening the influence of the local German-speaking aristocracy to the benefit of the local Estonian-speaking peasantry. In the light of that, some evidence suggests that the Estonian-speaking population considered Swedish rule as characterised by the rule of law, and the lower classes were later recorded to have expressed a wish for a return to Swedish rule.

Swedish reforms, some with lasting influence, also included the establishment of the University of Tartu (as well as other educational institutions such as the Gustav Adolf Grammar School), staunchly promoting Lutheranism and providing translations of the Bible into Estonian and creating a court of appeal in Tartu.

== Earliest years ==
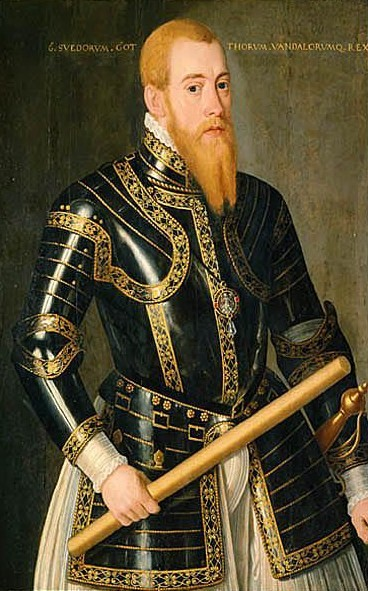
The era of Swedish rule in Estonia started under the rule of King Eric XIV.

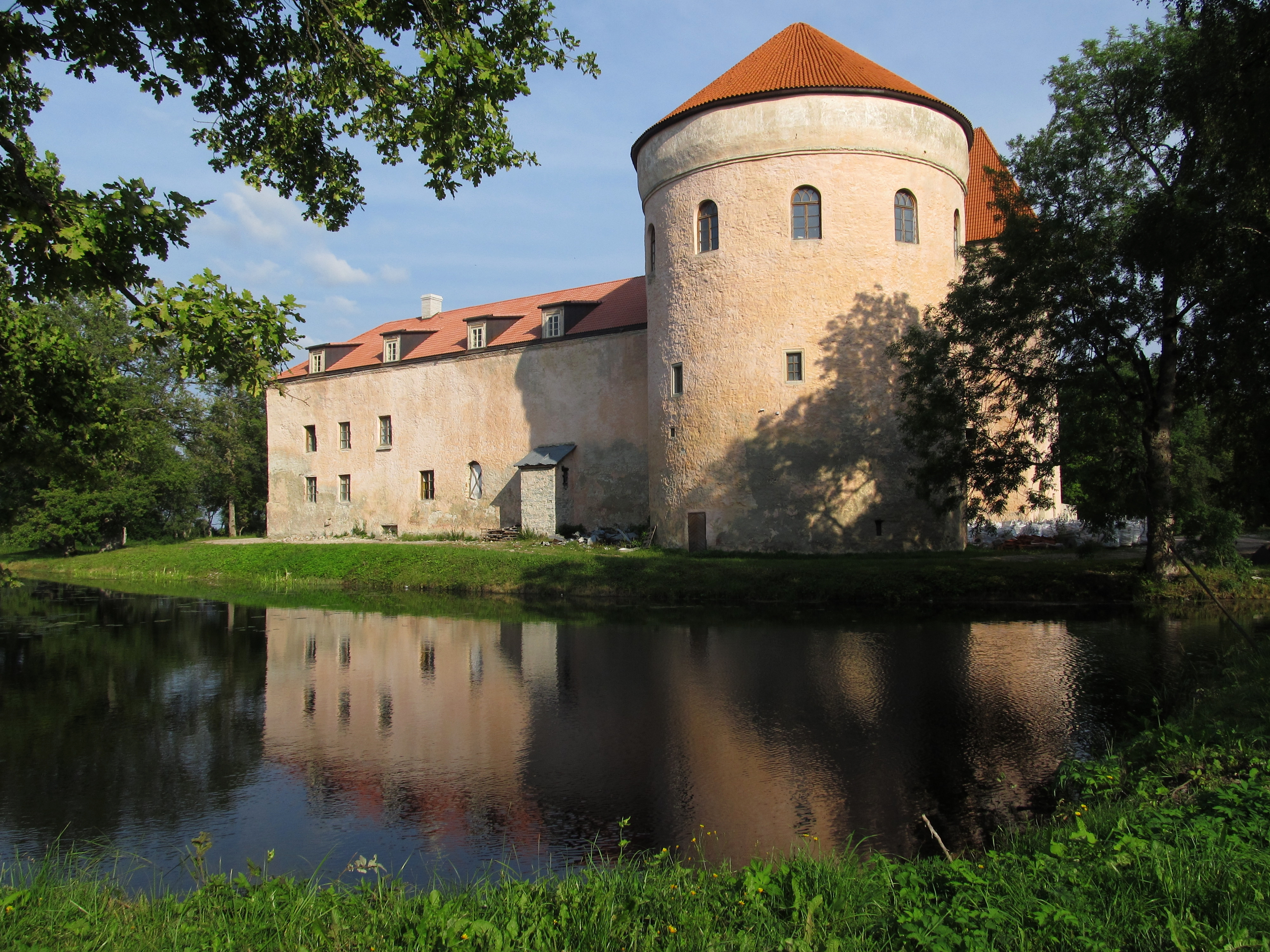
Koluvere Castle, the site of the 1573 Battle of Lode between the Swedish and invading Russian troops during the 1558–1583 Livonian War. The war ended with the confirmation of Swedish sovereignty over northern Estonia.

Repeated contacts between the inhabitants of present-day Sweden and Estonia began already during the Nordic Bronze Age and the first attested records of these contacts date from the Viking Age: For example, a runestone in Roslags-Bro Church in Sweden commemorates a man who was killed in Estonia during the 11th century. There has been a Swedish minority in Estonia at least since the Middle Ages. During the Northern Crusades, in the 13th century, Swedish crusaders made a failed attempt to conquer Estonia. Instead, as a result of the crusades, Denmark conquered north Estonia, whereas the crusading knights from Germany established the State of the Teutonic Order which covered most parts of Latvia and southern Estonia (and after 1346, northern Estonia as well). With the decline of the Teutonic Order and its state, Swedish political ambitions returned to Estonia. The future King John III had already as Grand Duke of Finland in the 1550s ambitions to establish Swedish rule in Estonia, but was held back by his father, Gustav Vasa. It was not until 1561 that the local nobility asked the new king, Eric XIV, to intervene in the ongoing Livonian War and protect the lands of Harjumaa, Virumaa and the city of Tallinn in exchange for overlord-ship. The Livonian War, in which Sweden now became involved, would last to 1583 (concluded by the Treaty of Plussa). For Sweden, it resulted in Sweden keeping the territory that had in 1561 sought Swedish protection, and additionally in the capture of the city of Narva.

The name of Livonia, formerly denoting all of present-day Estonia and Latvia, was now applied to Polish-controlled south Estonia and Latvia; while "Estonia" began to denote the Swedish controlled areas of north and west Estonia. It was not until the early 20th century that the term "Estonia" began to be used to signify all the lands where Estonian-speaking people lived.

Sweden started to reorganise the government in the new duchy only after the conclusion of the peace treaty with Russia in 1583. Like the Livonian estates, Estonian aristocracy and towns had surrendered on condition that their privileges be retained. Unlike in Livonia, where Poland soon violated the agreement, Swedish kings kept their promises to the city of Tallinn and the local nobility.

The landlords of north and west Estonia who formed the Estonian nobility were represented by its general assembly, convened regularly every third year (Landtag), and its executive body — the college of magistrates (Landratscollegium). The Swedish monarchy was represented by the lord lieutenant, later governor, and the area was governed with the help of the nobility. Crown properties consisted of the lands formerly owned by the Livonian Order, monasteries and bishops, and deserted manorial estates; part of the lands that had been deserted in the war came under the control of the local aristocracy. For administration, these lands were divided into fiefdoms, subdivided into crown manors headed by bailiffs. The Swedish kings generously gave lands into private possession — in reward both for merit and for service.

For that reason most of Estonian lands were in private ownership by the end of the 16th century, and the owners were mostly Baltic Germans. The Baltic German nobility gained extensive power in both the economic and political spheres, and later attempts of the crown to curb this power met with strong resistance. That central authority complied for such a long time was due to the continuous wars, which made it important to preserve the loyalty of the local aristocracy.

== Expansion ==
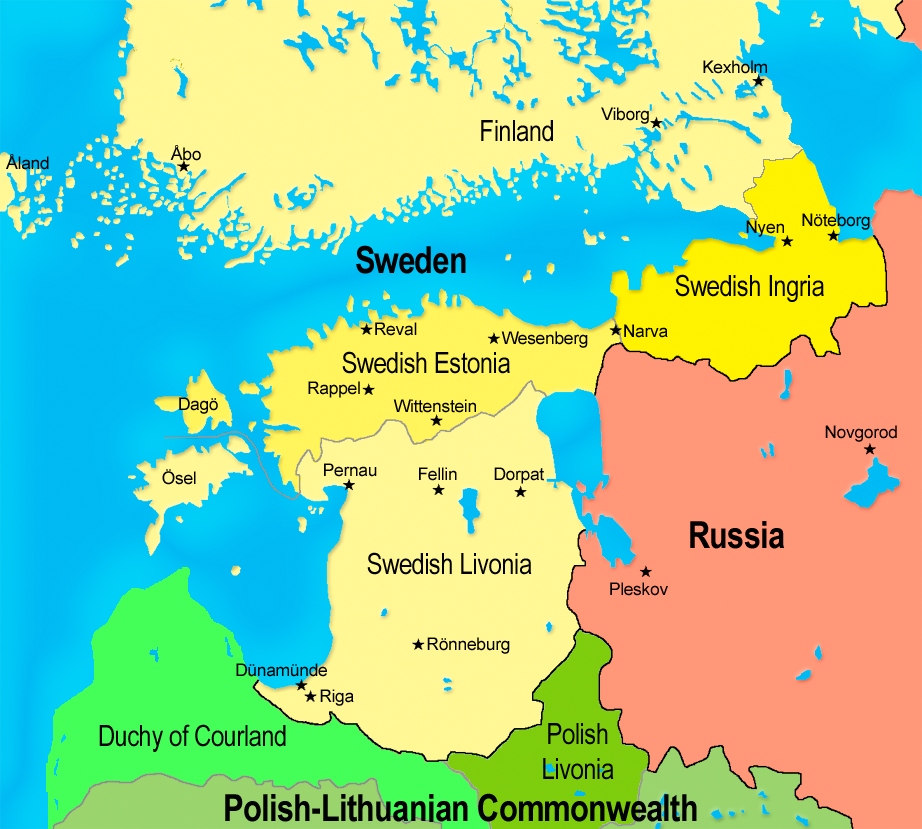
Baltic provinces of the Swedish Empire in the 17th century. Present-day Estonia consists of the Duchy of Estonia and parts of Swedish Livonia.

The conquest of the Duchy of Estonia was the starting point of a policy of expansion for Sweden, which would lead to a period in Swedish history referred to as the Swedish Empire. During the 17th century, Sweden attained large areas around the Baltic Sea. In 1629, Polish-controlled Livonia, including the southern parts of present-day Estonia, was conquered by Swedish forces, and in 1645 the island of Saaremaa (Ösel) was ceded by Denmark to Sweden as a part of the Peace Treaty of Brömsebro.

While the surrender of northern Estonia to Sweden was seen as voluntary, Livonia was regarded as an occupied territory. King Gustavus Adolphus (1611–1632) consequently only partly restored the privileges of the Livonian aristocracy, lost during the Polish years. Led by the governor-general, a strong central authority was developed and Swedish laws instituted. Much of the local aristocracy had also fled during the war, and instead members of the Swedish nobility moved to seize possession of many of the Livonian estates.

The Swedish authorities exercised a strict control over religious and intellectual life, arranging regular inspections, the so-called visitations, from the end of the 16th century and throughout the 17th century. The higher clergy — bishops or superintendents — visited congregation after congregation to inspect the religious beliefs of peasants and to root out the remnants of paganism or Catholicism. The first large scale visitation was carried out by Johannes Rudbeckius. Gustavus Adolphus also, through the aid of governor Johan Skytte, instituted the court of appeal in Tartu and the University of Tartu.

However, the successors to Gustavus Adolphus ceded more rights to the Livonian aristocracy. This was partly caused by the fact that the state had surrendered its economic and political power by transferring most crown properties to private hands (mostly Swedish high aristocracy for their merits). The Livonian nobility had won recognition by 1647: it too was now represented in a regional Landtag and an executive Landratscollegium. The Landtag was convened every three years and the policies discussed with the central authority. The aristocracy of Estonia, Livonia and Ösel (Saaremaa) had no representation in the Swedish Diet (Riksdag).

== During Charles XI ==
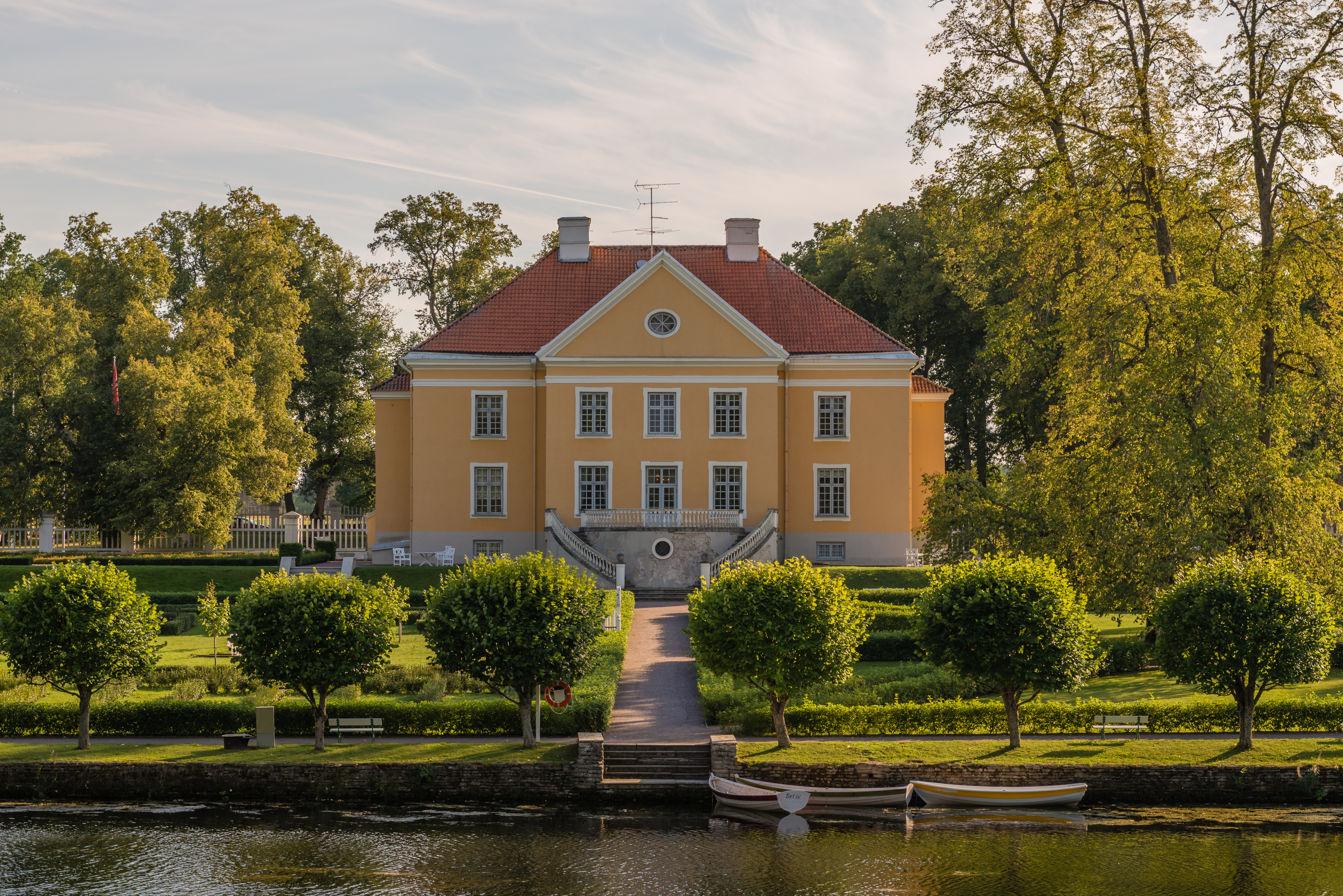
The manor of Palms was built during the reign of Charles XI.

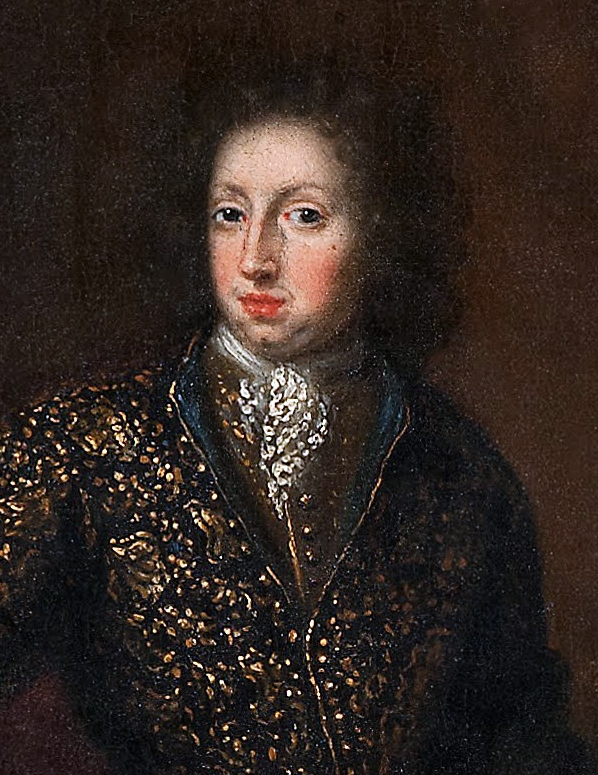
Charles XI initiated several reforms in Swedish-controlled Estonia.

The reign of King Charles XI (1672–1697) brought drastic changes to Sweden's policy in its overseas provinces. As a result of the continuous warfare and the transfer of the crown properties into private possession, the revenues of the Swedish state had diminished. To increase its revenues, the so-called reduction of the possessions of the nobility was carried out. The reduction of manorial lands was linked to another radical change — the formation of absolutist monarchy under Charles XI, which sought to strengthen central authority in all parts of the empire and promoted strong links between the mainland and the overseas provinces.

In 1680, the Swedish Riksdag declared the so-called Great Reduction. While former reductions had not spread to Estonia and Livonia, this decision extended to these areas as well. All holdings which had gone into private possession since the beginning of Swedish rule were to be reduced. This requirement met with fierce opposition from the local nobility. The local upper classes saw this decision by the Swedish Riksdag — taken without the approval of the local Landtags — as a violation of their rights, as the dual government of state and aristocracy which had functioned so far; in the understanding of the Livonian nobility the overseas provinces were linked to Sweden through a union. In the Duchy of Estonia, where land ownership was more clearly determined and there were more manors passed on according to an ancient inheritance law, the 1680 reduction went quite peacefully.

The reduction was also followed by other reforms. The tenants of manors were no longer allowed to beat farmers; peasants could sue the tenants, even appeal to the king himself. It was forbidden to sell peasants without land, to send them away from their lands or to take over their lands. The status of Estonian peasants on crown manors was not yet comparable to free peasants in Sweden, but it was much better than the status of peasants on private lands. Charles XI announced his intention to abolish serfdom in Estonian crown manors when the reduction started, as serfdom was peculiar to the Baltic provinces.

== Great Northern War and the end of Swedish rule in Estonia ==
The reforms carried out in Estonia under Charles XI did not have a long-lasting effect; in reality only Swedish church law was put into practice. In 1697 Charles XI died of cancer and his son Charles XII acceded to the throne and in 1700 the Great Northern War broke out. By 1699 an anti-Swedish alliance had been formed by Poland, Denmark and Russia. The war, which lasted to 1721 and in which one of the major Swedish victories was fought in Estonia, the Battle of Narva, ultimately proved disastrous to Sweden. In 1709, Russian forces had begun to lay siege to Riga, the centre of Livonia; after the capture of Riga in 1710 the Livonian and Estonian cities surrendered one after another. The war on Estonian territory ended with the capitulation of Tallinn in September 1710. As Russia considered the support of the local nobility to be essential in consolidating its power, the towns and the aristocrats achieved favourable terms of capitulation. The incorporation of Estonia and Livonia into Russia was stated in the Peace of Nystad in 1721, ending the warfare which had continued for ten more years outside Estonia.

== See also ==
- History of Estonia
- History of Sweden
