= Battle of Petschora =

Battle in the Great Northern War

- Part of the Great Northern War
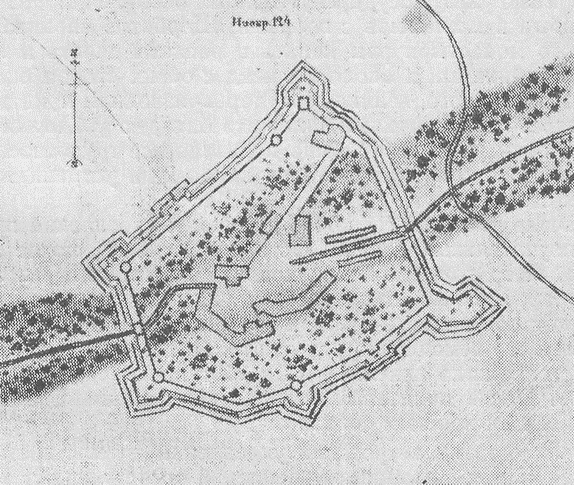
- Petschora in 1701
| Date | February 12, 1701 (O.S.); February 13, 1701 (Swedish calendar); February 23, 1701 (N.S.) |
| Location | Pechory, Russia |
| Result | Swedish victory |

Belligerents
| Swedish Empire | Tsardom of Russia |

Commanders and leaders
| Jacob Spens | Unknown |

Strength
| 2,100 men, with 2,000 peasants | 6,000 men |

Casualties and losses
| 30 killed, 60 wounded | 500 killed |

The Battle of Petschora took place on February 23, 1701 near the village of Pechory, Russia during the second year of the Great Northern War. The Swedish army of about 2,100 men assisted by approximately 2,000 peasants under the command of Jacob Spens defeated a Russian force of about 6,000 men.

== Prelude ==
After the crushing defeat at Narva by Charles XII of Sweden, the Russian tsar Peter I of Russia gathered his forces near the Swedish borders at Pskov and Gdov to start a new offensive into the Swedish Livonia. Charles who suspected the offensive, gathered forces of his own under the command of Magnus Stenbock and Jacob Spens to cross the Russian border and destroy the two footholds of Izborsk and Petschora. Stenbock saw his force heavily outnumbered by the guarding Russian army at Gdov and so, forced to retreat, contented himself with burning and savaging the Russian lands in the area before crossing the Swedish border.

== Fighting at Petschora ==
Spens arrived at his destination in late February and there sought to meet the Russian army in the open field. The two armies met outside the town of Petschora on 23 February. The Russians launched an attack on the peasants assisting the Swedes, causing riots in the lines. However, Spens then Counterattacked with his Swedish Lifeguard of Horse which drove the Russians to seek cover in the town under fierce fighting. The effective passages for cavalry attacks in the town became too narrow and Spens pulled them back for his infantry to break down their opponents. The Russians then fled into the houses shooting at the Swedes who in turn set the town on fire where many were burned alive. However, the main bulk of the Russians reached the monastery to escape the Swedish onslaught. The Swedes unsuccessfully stormed its surrounding walls which proved too hard without artillery. Spens aborted the operation while some Cossacks attacked his accompanying peasants. He, instead satisfied with burning the nearby villages and then returned to the Swedish border. The Swedes had lost 30 men killed and another 60 wounded in the fighting, the Russians on the other hand lost 500 men killed excluding the ones who were burnt to death in the town.

== Aftermath ==
The Russian Tsar presumed the reconnaissance operation to be a step in a full scale Swedish invasion and so gave orders for no Russians to retreat any further than the Pskov–Gdov line which he reinforced along with Izborsk and Petschora where he built fortresses. However, Charles who were stuck at Laiuse because of the ongoing winter, later broke up with his army having been in winter quarters and started his march towards the south, against the Saxons under Augustus II whom he estimated being the greatest current threat. After a while, the Swedish and Saxon armies met in the battle of Düna where the Swedish king, after a bold landing, managed to cross the river and force his opponents to retreat, leaving all of Courland open for occupation. Later, while entering the Polish–Lithuanian Commonwealth on the chase after king Augustus—who were also the ruler of the commonwealth—the Russians started their offensive deep into the Swedish overseas, which they would seize 20 years later, during the end of the war. However, the same year, in 1701, they first encountered the Swedish general Wolmar Anton von Schlippenbach in the battle of Rauge where Boris Sheremetev—one of Peters' foremost generals—was defeated, which would only be the beginning of Peters' ambition for an "open window to the west".

== Literature ==
- Margus Laidre (1996). Segern vid Narva: Början till en stormakts fall.
- Boris Grigorjev & Aleksandr Bespalov (2012). Kampen mot övermakten. Baltikums fall 1700–1710.
- Goelgel, Naundorff. Historisch-politisch- und geographische Beschreibung des Königreichs Schweden, Volym 1. Riegel (1708).
