= Battle of Erastfer =

1701 battle during the Great Northern War

- Part of the Great Northern War
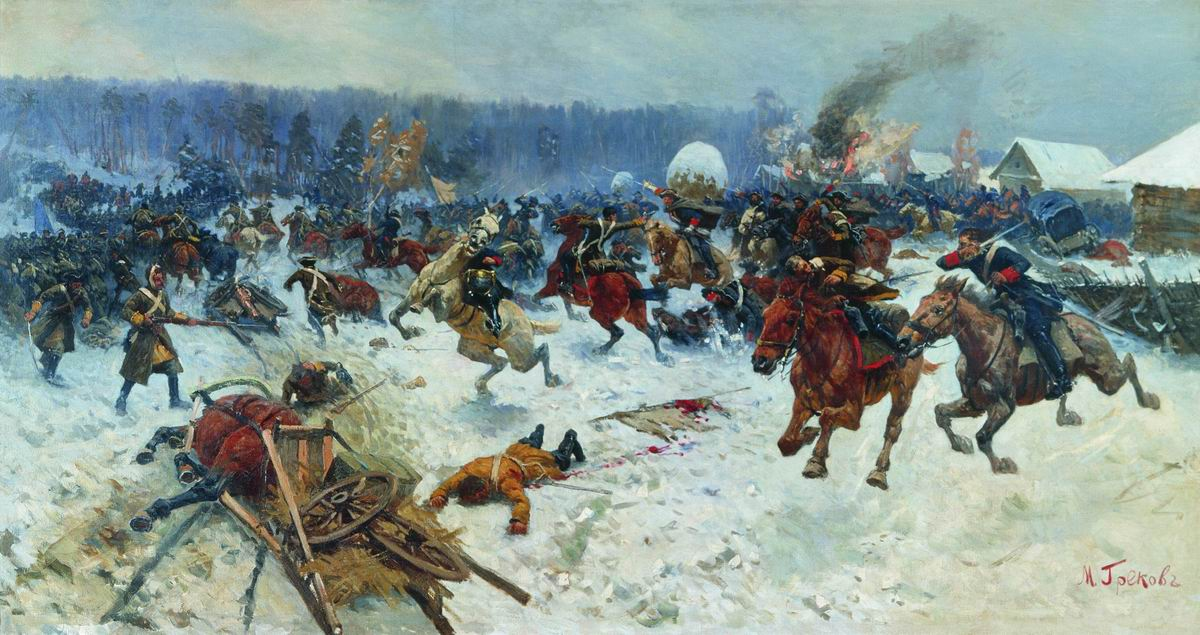
- The Battle of Erastfer by Mitrophan Grekov (1914)
Date	29 December 1701 (O.S.); 30 December 1701 (Swedish calendar); 9 January 1702 (N.S.)
Location	Erastfer, Swedish Livonia (present-day Erastvere, Estonia) 57°58′N 26°47′E
Result	Russian victory

Belligerents
(yes) Swedish Empire	Tsardom of Russia

Commanders and leaders
(Swedish Empire) Wolmar Anton von Schlippenbach	(Tsardom of Russia) Boris Sheremetev

Strength
3,470 men, 6 artillery pieces	18,087 men, 20 or 30 artillery pieces

Casualties and losses
Swedish estimate: 700 killed, 350 captured Russian estimate: 3,000 killed, 150–400 captured 4 cannons, 8 banners	1,000 killed 2,000 wounded

The Battle of Erastfer (also Battle of Errestfer, Battle of Erastvere) took place on 29 December 1701 (O.S.) / 30 December 1701 (Swedish calendar) / 9 January / 1702 (N.S.) near Erastfer in eastern Swedish Livonia (present-day Erastvere in Estonia) between a Russian force of around 13,000 regulars along with 6,000 irregulars led by general Boris Sheremetev and a Swedish force of about 3,470 men (at least 1,000 men were absent from the ranks for various reasons on the day of the battle, resulting in an actual fighting force of about 2,200–2,470 men), under the command of Wolmar Anton von Schlippenbach. The Swedes were defeated, with a loss of 1,000 men killed and captured along with all their artillery pieces. The Russians sustained about 1,000 killed along with another 2,000 wounded (according to a Russian soldier who later admitted, after being captured by the Swedes, to 3,000 total losses).

== Aftermath ==
Although Sheremetev pulled back to Pskov after the battle, the next year he fought the Swedes again under Schlippenbach at the Battle of Hummelshof.

Before invading Ingria, Tsar Peter I secured Poland's continued participation in the war against Sweden by promising King Augustus II of Poland, 20,000 Russian troops, 100,000 pounds of gunpowder, and 100,000 rubles per year over three years.

== Celebration ==
It was the first significant Russian victory in the Great Northern War. Peter I considered the battle a turning point - the first ever Russian victory against the Swedes in a field battle. Along with a gift of the tsar's portrait adorned with diamonds, Sheremetev was elevated to general feldmarshall. All of the participating officers were gifted money and regular soldiers a freshly minted silver ducat. In Moscow a huge victory celebration was held, along with cannon volleys, thanksgiving services, and free wine, beer, mead and vodka. A firework ended the celebration in the evening.
