= Battle of Kletsk (1706) =

Battle of the Great Northern War

Coordinates: 53°03′49″N 26°38′21″E

- Part of the Great Northern War
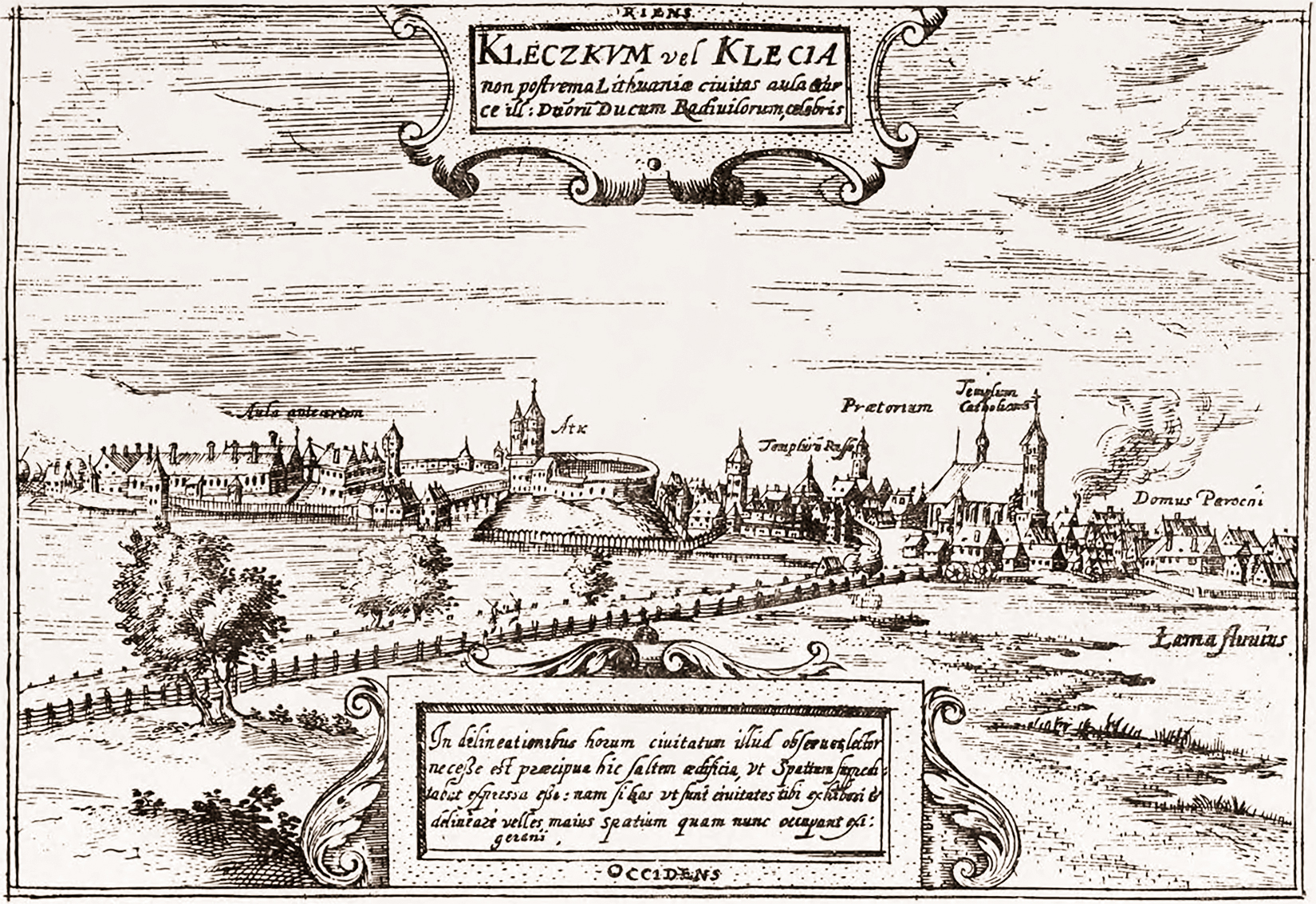
- Kletsk and the bridge going over the marshes – Tamaš Makoǔski
Date	19 April 1706 (O.S.); 20 April 1706 (Swedish calendar); 30 April 1706 (N.S.)
Location	Kletsk, present-day Belarus
Result	Swedish victory

Belligerents
Swedish Empire	Tsardom of Russia

Commanders and leaders
(Swedish Empire) Carl Gustaf Creutz	(Tsardom of Russia) Semjon Nepljujev; Danylo Apostol

Strength
1,500 cavalry	4,700 infantry and cavalry 4 artillery pieces

Casualties and losses
15 dead 20 wounded	500 dead (Russian claim); 2,025 dead (Swedish claim); 72 captured

The Battle of Kletsk took place on 30 April 1706 (Gregorian calendar), in- and outside the city of Kletsk, Belarus during Charles XII's Polish campaign of 1701–1706, in the Great Northern War. The Swedish forces were led by Carl Gustaf Creutz who defeated a larger Russian–Cossack force under the command of Semjon Nepljujev and Danylo Apostol. Many of the Russian and Cossack regiments participating in the battle were wiped out and ceased to exist as fighting units. Some historians consider the main reason for the defeat to be the actions of the Ukrainian Cossacks, who immediately turned into a blameless flight at the sight of the Swedish attacks, disrupting the formation of the Russian units behind them.

== Prelude ==
Towards the end of the 17th century Russia, Denmark–Norway and Saxony formed a coalition against the Swedish Empire in order to regain territory lost in earlier wars. The Swedish king, Charles XII, then invaded the Polish–Lithuanian Commonwealth in his 1701–1706 campaign. He forced Augustus the Strong from the Polish throne in 1704, replacing him with pro-Swedish Stanislaw Leszczynski.

In January 1706 a large force of Russians were cut off and trapped during the battle of Grodno by Charles XII and his similarly sized army. This caused the Russian Czar, Peter the Great, to assemble an army to go to their assistance. He also ordered the Cossack Hetman, Ivan Mazepa – who at the time was an ally to Russia – to gather an army of 14,000 men to harass and disrupt the Swedish troops blockading Grodno. However, the Swedes launched counter-attacks against the raiding Cossacks which inflicted many casualties.

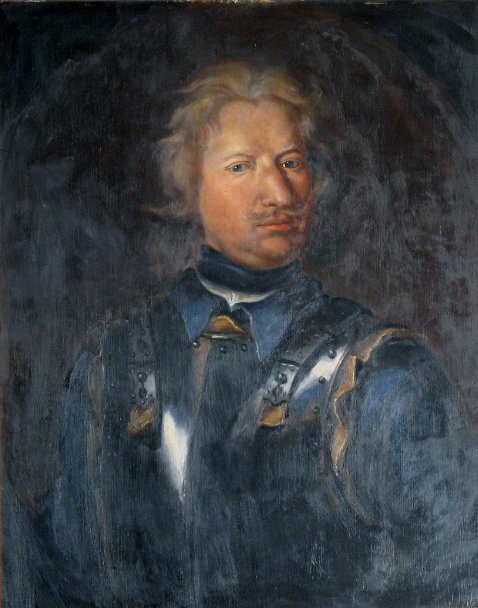
Carl Gustaf Creutz

One of these counter-attacks was commanded by Carl Gustaf Creutz. He trapped a substantial number of Cossacks and Poles in the city of Lyakhavichy with his force of 2,000 men and besieged them. In response Mazepa then sent a relief-party of 4,700 soldiers. Initially they had been despatched to help those trapped in Grodno, but they were diverted to Lyakhavichy. After several days march they arrived at the city of Kletsk, some 25 kilometres (16 mi) east of Lyakhavichy, where they set up camp. Creutz gained knowledge of this and set off against Kletsk with 1,500 cavalry, leaving 500 dragoons to continue the siege. They marched overnight and arrived at Klatsk the next morning.

== Battle ==
Immediately on their arrival the Swedes charged a group of Cossacks guarding the 500-meter-long (1,600 ft) bridge crossing the marshes to Kletsk under the command of Danylo Apostol. The Cossacks were quickly overwhelmed and fled in disorder towards the bridge, but were trapped because of wagons blocking their escape route. The Swedes easily finished them off, and hunted down and killed those Cossacks who attempted to escape into the marshes. Danylo Apostol had his horse shot dead during the fighting, but continued to flee on another one before eventually being taken prisoner. Meanwhile, the Russian commander Semjon Nepljujev gathered the troops and artillery in the city and advanced to the assistance of the Cossacks. When he realised that the bridge had been captured he chose to retreat. Four artillery guns were abandoned and captured by the Swedes, who immediately turned them against the retreating Russians.

The majority of this retreating force retreated into Kletsk and fortified themselves inside the city. This is where the hardest fighting took place and a Swedish account records: "All the walls were scratched by their shots and bullets". The Swedes stormed into the city before the disorganised Russians could organise a proper defence. Soon the surviving Russian and Cossack troops were beaten and in full retreat. They ran south and east towards the forest. However, the majority of these were cut down in the fields, while others were drowned in the swamps. The official Swedish record claims the fleeing soldiers had: "thrown away most of their clothing and equipment and in barely a shirt tried to save themselves".

== Aftermath ==
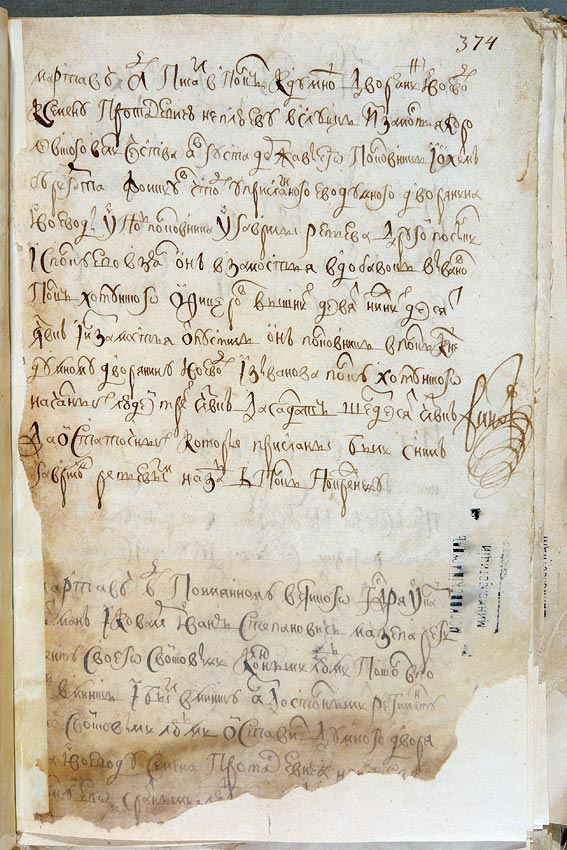
Letter to Czar Peter from Nepljujev

The German mayor of Kletsk, Johan Heinrich Cibinski, later announced that he had counted and buried 2,025 dead Russian or Cossack soldiers lying inside the city of Kletsk, but that there should be at least as many bodies again lying around the outskirts, and in the fields, forests and swamps. The Swedish casualties were 15 killed and 16 wounded. The Russians, however, had lost at least 4,000 men dead and 71 captured, including a Colonel, Petro Pryma. In addition, four cannons, 16 standards and 2,000 horses were lost to the Swedes. On 17 May the Swedish king Charles XII visited the battlefield and noted that the victory was larger than he had initially thought.

A bullet wounded Semjon Nepljujev in his arm during the fighting. He later sent a message to the Czar Peter I, in which he claimed the Swedish forces had outnumbered his own, and blamed Ivan Mazepa for having incorrectly calculated the numbers of the Swedes at Lyakhavichy, which he had said did not exceed 800 men.

The battle also had a morale effect on the 1,300 soldiers still besieged in Lyakhavichy, who surrendered just days after the return of Creutz and his men with prisoners and captured equipment. The Lyakhavichy fortress was then destroyed. Not long after, Creutz was promoted from colonel to general for his actions. He was later captured in the surrender at Perevolochna, and became a prisoner of war in Russia until 1722; returning home after 13 years in captivity. He then took command of the newly raised Life Regiment of Horse. During that time the Swedish king had died in Norway and the war had ended the year before in 1721. The defences of Kletsk were destroyed by the Swedes and were never rebuilt.

== Bibliography ==
- Dictionary of Swedish National Biography, Carl Gustaf Creutz
- Slaget vid Kletsk, Arkivcentrum, December 2009, pp. 6–12
- Oglolbin, N. N., The Battle of Kletzk against Swedish Forces. A Journal by S. P. Neplynyev, April 19, 1706. Battle of Kletsk
- Tucker, S.C., A Global Chronology of Conflict, Vol. Two (2010) Santa Barbara: ABC-CLIO, LLC, ISBN 9781851096671
- Ullgren, Peter, Det stora nordiska kriget 1700–1721 (in Swedish) (2008) Stockholm, Prisma. ISBN 978-91-518-5107-5
- Великанов В.С. «Непомысленная баталия»: участие корпуса С.П. Неплюева в сражении при Клецке 19/30 апреля 1706 г. // Военно-исторический журнал "Старый Цейхгауз". — № 63 (1/2015). М. 2015
