= Carl Gustaf Creutz =

Swedish general (1660–1728)

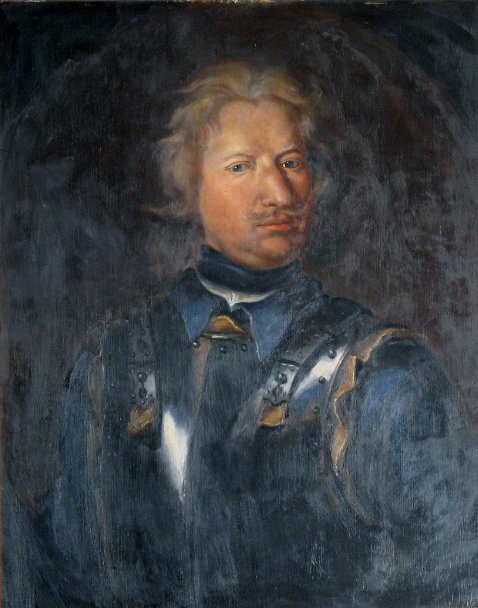
- Carl Gustaf Creutz by Johan David Schwartz
- Born: 25 January 1660; Falun, Dalarna, Sweden
- Died: 12 March 1728 (aged 68); Stockholm, Sweden
- Spouse: Sofia Kristina Natt och Dag
- Children: Lorentz Creutz; Beata Sophia
- Relatives: Lorentz Creutz (father), Elsa Duwall (mother)
- Military career
- Allegiance: Sweden
- Branch: Cavalry
- Service years: 1676–1728
- Rank: General
- Commands: Life Regiment of Horse
- Conflicts: Scanian War; Battle of Halmstad; Battle of Lund; Battle of Landskrona; Great Northern War; Landing at Humlebæk; Battle of Petschora; Battle of Narva; Crossing of the Düna; Battle of Kliszów; Battle of Pułtusk; Siege of Lachowicze; Battle of Kletsk; Battle of Grodno; Battle of Holowczyn; Battle of Poltava

Carl Gustaf Creutz (25 January 1660 − 12 March 1728) was a Swedish general.

He served as a page of Charles XI and experienced the Scanian War and by 1691 he was a captain in the Life Regiment of Horse. The Great Northern War began in 1700 and Creutz participated in the Landing on Humlebæk. He distinguished himself at the battles of Petschora and Kletsh. Promotions to major and lieutenant colonel then came quickly. Creutz became a colonel and commander of the Life Regiment of Horse in 1704. The Battle of Poltava in 1709 brought Creutz command of the entire cavalry. However, he had to surrender soon after Perevolotnya. After Count Piper's death, he was the senior Swedish prisoner in Russia, of which his extant correspondence bears visible witness. In 1722, he was able to return to Sweden and service in the cavalry. He was named a general that year.
