= Siege of Riga (1709–1710) =

Siege during the Great Northern War

- Part of the Great Northern War
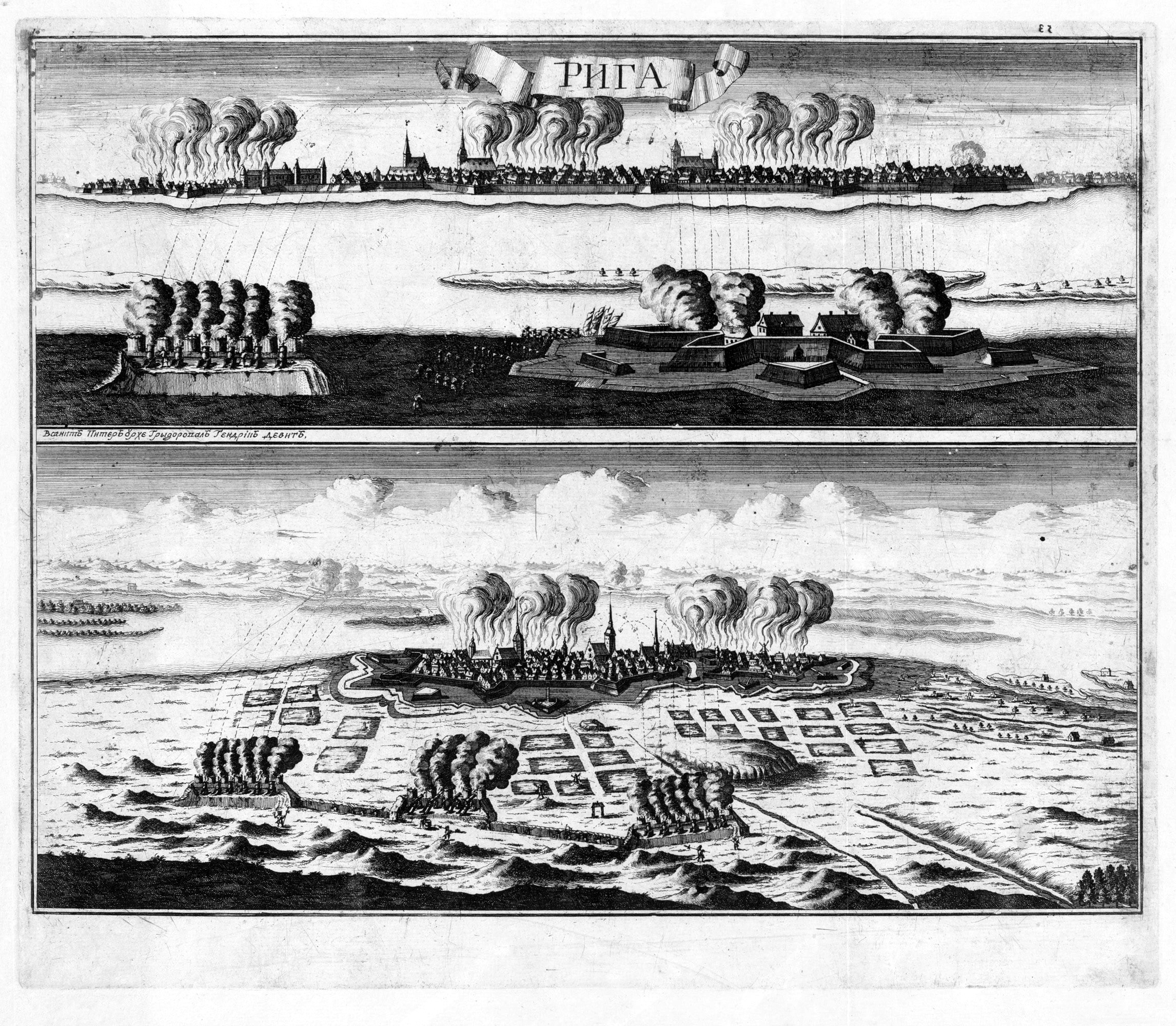
- View and plan of the siege of Riga on 14 July 1710. Engraving by Dewitt Hendrick.
Date	27 October 1709 – 4 July 1710 (O.S.); 28 October 1709 – 5 July 1710 (Sw.); 6 November 1709 – 15 July 1710 (N.S.)
Location	Riga 56°56′56″N 24°6′23″E
Result	Russian victory
Territorial changes	Riga is captured by Russian forces

Belligerents
Swedish Empire	Tsardom of Russia

Commanders and leaders
Nils Jonsson Stromberg af Clastorp (surrendered)	Boris Sheremetev; Anikita Repnin

Strength
13,400 men; 563 guns; 66 mortar; 12 howitzers	40,000 men; siege artillery (50 barrels)

Casualties and losses
5,132 surrendered	Unknown

The siege of Riga in 1709–1710 was a military operation of the army of the Tsardom of Russia during the Great Northern War against the forces of the Swedish Empire defending the fortress of Riga. As a result of the operation, Riga was taken by Russian troops.

== Background ==
After the defeat of the Swedes at Poltava and the surrender of the Swedish army at Perevolochna, Peter the Great decided to intensify the fighting in the Baltics and instructed Field Marshal General Boris Sheremetev to take Riga.

Map of Riga (around 1710)

The transfer of the Russian army from near Poltava to Riga was fraught with considerable difficulties due to the rains and the beginning of the thaw. At the beginning of October, Russian troops approached Dinaburg. A detachment of three dragoon regiments under the command of Volkonsky was sent to Courland for the purpose of reconnaissance. 15 (26) October Russian troops crossed the border of Swedish Livonia and moved along the Western Dvina River to Riga. The main forces marched along the left bank of the river, and four dragoon regiments under the command of General Rudolph Felix Bauer and Don Cossacks of Ataman Mitrofan Lobanov - along the right bank of the Western Dvina. On 27 October (6 November) the Russian army blockaded Riga and began siege works.

At the beginning of the 18th century Riga was one of the most powerful fortresses in Europe with a castle and a citadel. It was surrounded by strong walls with 5 bastions, 2 ravelins and 2 shants, in front of which there was a moat with water. In front of the fortress there was a forstadt fortified with an earthen rampart and palisades. On the opposite bank of the Western Dvina River was the fort Kobronschanz (named after Samuel Cockburn), which covered a pontoon bridge across the river, reinforced with four bastions and one half-bastion and also surrounded by a water moat.

The garrison of the fortress under the command of General Nils Stromberg numbered 13,400 men with 563 cannons, 66 mortars and 12 howitzers.

Russian forces in the autumn of 1709 numbered about 40,000 men with 32 field artillery guns, which were joined by another 18 guns in November.

== Siege ==
=== Autumn–winter ===
When the Russian troops arrived, Stromberg ordered the destruction of the pontoon bridge across the river and the abandonment of Kobronschanz, evacuating the Swedish troops there to Riga. An artillery battery was installed in the fort, which was occupied by the Russian troops without a single shot being fired. In addition, in order to exclude assistance to the Swedes from the sea, Russian troops installed artillery batteries on both banks of the river between Riga and the fortress of Dunamunde, located at the mouth of the Dvina. A bridge was built seven kilometres above Riga for the interaction of Russian units located on both sides of the river.

On 10 (21) November (according to other sources, 9 (20) November) Peter the Great arrived near Riga for one day and personally fired three shots at the city, thus starting a long bombardment of the fortress. Initially the bombardment was ineffective, as the Russian field artillery could not get the cannonballs across the Dvina River. At the end of November, most of the Russian army under the command of Sheremetev was withdrawn to Courland and settled for winter quarters in Mitava. Only the six thousandth detachment under the command of Anikita Repnin remained near Riga, which continued the siege works.

On 2 (13) December the siege work was completed. By the same time, heavy Russian artillery arrived near Riga, which settled in Kobronschanz and began a devastating bombardment of Riga. The shelling was particularly effective on 12 (23) December, when the tower of the Riga citadel, where the powder cellar was located, caught fire. The ensuing explosion killed about 800 people.

=== Spring–summer ===
On 11 (22) March, Field Marshal Sheremetev returned to the troops besieging Riga and again led the siege works. In April, Alexander Danilovich Menshikov came to Riga and was instructed to strengthen the fortifications of the besieging army in order to prevent the Swedish fleet from reaching the besieged troops. As a result of his activities, new fortifications were built at the mouth of the Dvina River, which were armed with 32 guns and 700 soldiers and 300 Don Cossacks with boats. In addition, another fortification was built two kilometres below Riga, named Alexandershants in Menshikov's honour, and the Dvina River was covered with a pile bridge reinforced with chain-linked timbers. Cannons were installed on both sides of the bridge.

Already on 28 April (9 May) the Swedish fleet of nine ships tried to break through to Riga from the direction of Dunamunda, but the attempt failed due to the opposition of Russian artillery.

The next day all Russian forces pulled up from their winter quarters to Riga and positioned themselves around the city: Menshikov's division was positioned in the area of Alexandershants and the new bridge, Anikita Repnin's division was positioned above Riga, and Ludwig Nikolaus von Hallart's division took up positions directly in front of Riga. In addition, Repnin's and Hallart's units occupied the opposite bank of the river at Kobronschanz and new fortifications downstream. 10 (21) May to Riga approached the siege artillery led by General Bruce.

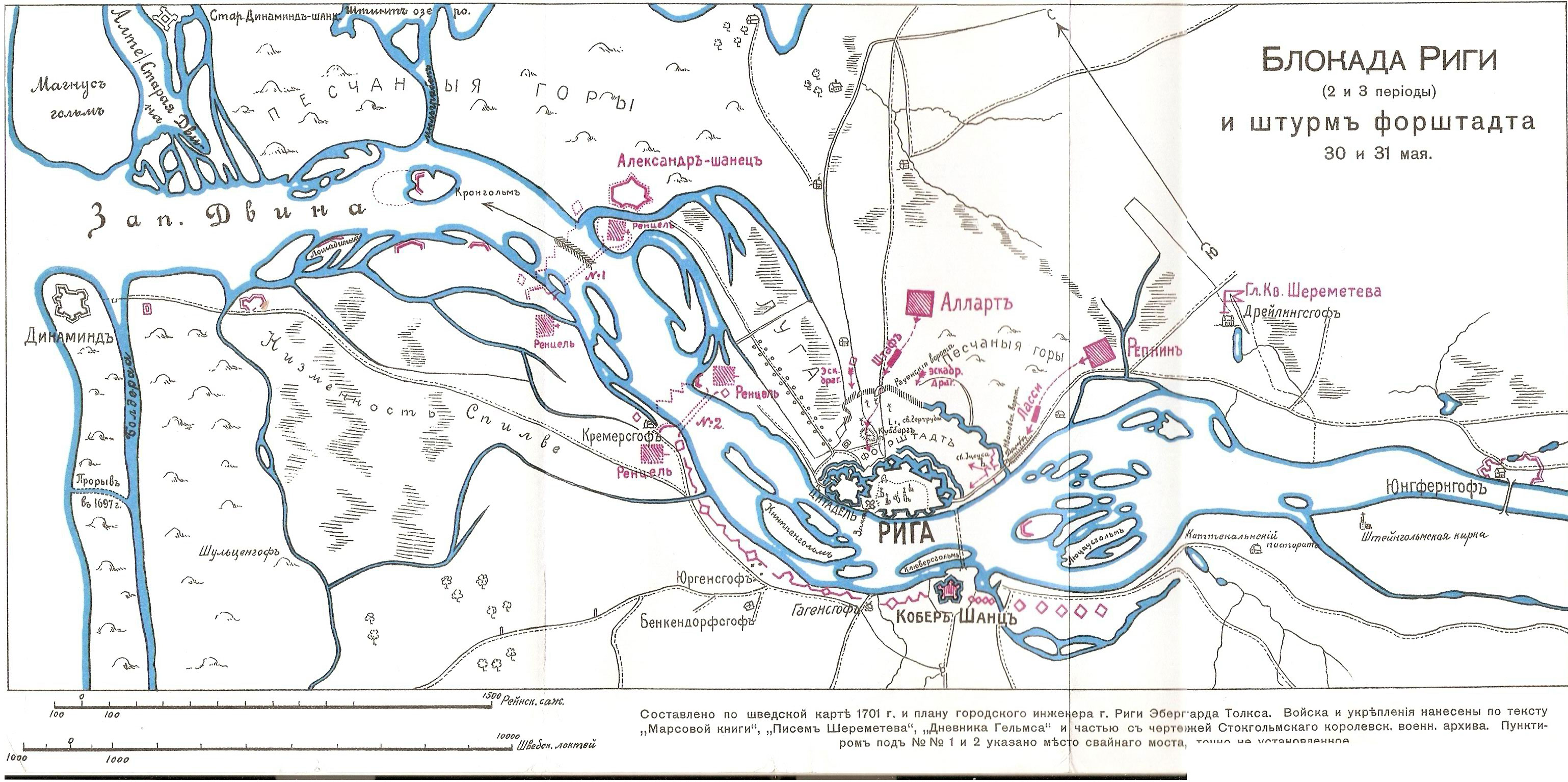
Siege of Riga and storming of the suburbs (30 May 1710)

In May a plague epidemic broke out among the besiegers and besieged.

On 27 May (7 June), the Russian command received intelligence that the Swedes were planning to transfer a 20,000-strong corps from Skåne under the command of General Magnus Stenbock to unblock Riga. General Ernst Detlof von Krassow's 7,000-strong detachment was planned to join these troops. To counteract the landing, it was decided to occupy the suburbs of Riga and continue bombarding it from positions in the immediate vicinity. On 30–31 May (10–11 June) two Russian detachments with a total of 2,400 men under the command of Brigadier Staf and Colonel Peter Lacy occupied the suburb of Riga, after which three Russian batteries with 14 mortars were installed there.

In the middle of June a Swedish squadron of 24 ships arrived to Dunamund, which tried to land a landing force and break through to Riga. The Swedes failed to land the landing force because of the Russian artillery resistance, and the three Swedish ships that managed to break through to Riga on 9 (20) June were forced to return to Dunamunde under fire, after which the Swedish squadron went to sea.

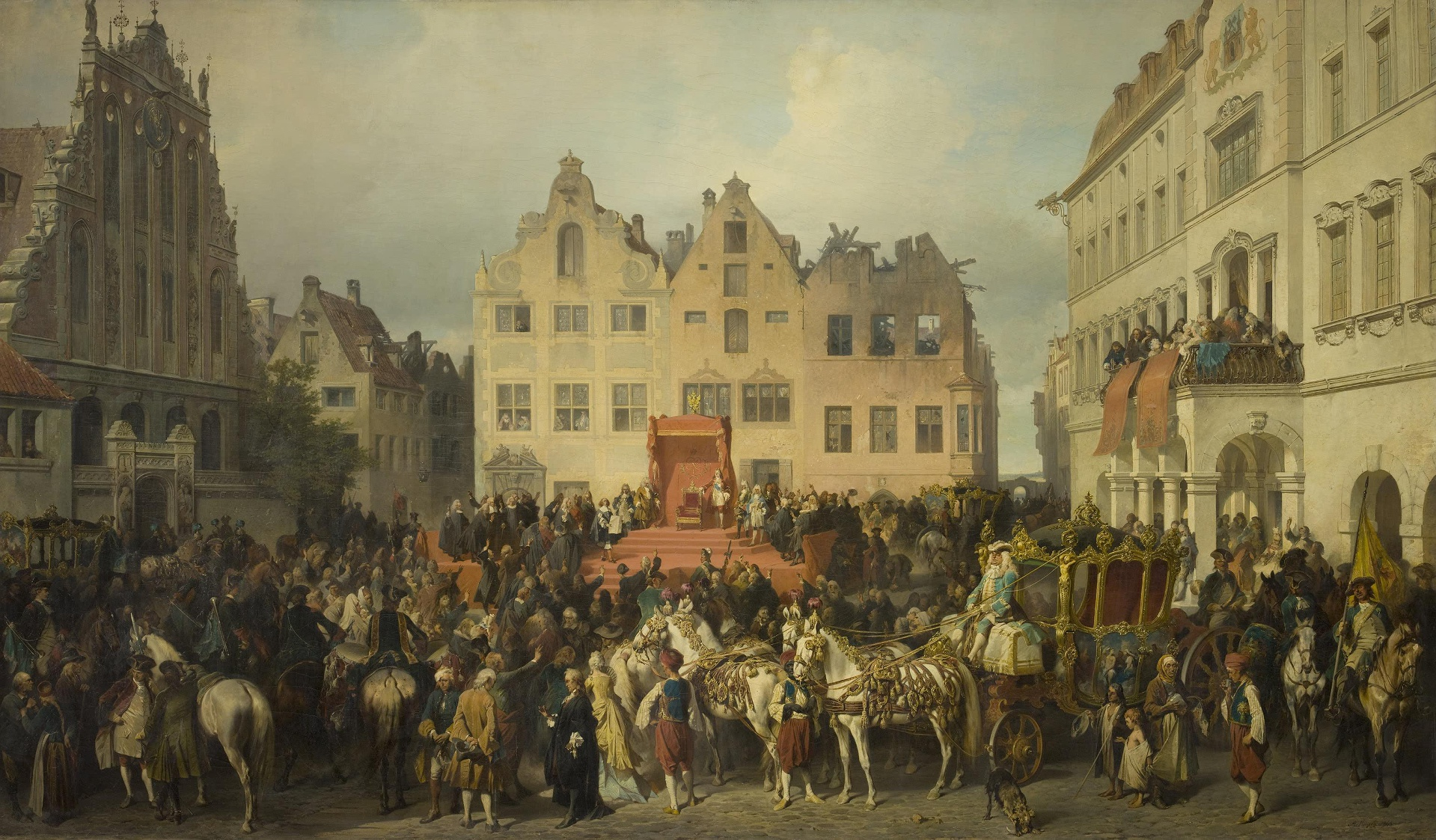
Riga's Oath of Allegiance to Russia in 1710. Painting by Alexander von Kotzebue

The next day the Swedes requested an armistice for three days, but at the end of this period they refused to capitulate. The Russians began an intensified bombardment of Riga—from 14 (25) to 24 June (5 July) 3,388 bombs were fired. The Swedes again requested a truce and two days later, on 4 (15) July, Riga capitulated. On the same day the Ingermanland, Kiev, Astrakhan, Siberian, Kazan and Butyr infantry regiments entered Riga through the Sand Gate, led by General Anikita Repnin. On 12 (23) July General Field Marshal Count Boris Sheremetev solemnly entered the city. Brigadier L. S. Chirikov was appointed Ober-commandant of Riga (in January 1711 he was replaced in this position by Major-General Yakov Vasilievich Polonsky).

== Aftermath ==
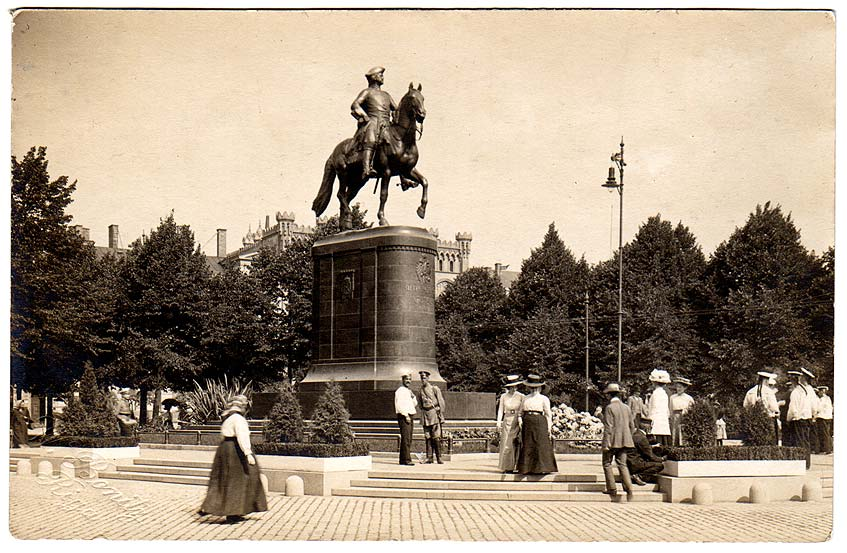
Monument to Tsar Peter I of Russia in Riga (1910–1917), erected in honor of the 200th anniversary of the capitulation of Riga and the official visit of Emperor Nicholas II to Riga (1910)

The Russian army captured all Swedish artillery (561 cannon, 66 mortars, 7 howitzers). The remnants of the garrison – 5,132 men, of whom 2,905 were sick – surrendered as prisoners. Some of the Swedes were exchanged for Russian prisoners of war captured at Narva in 1700, the rest were released for nothing.

== Legacy ==
In 1910, on the occasion of the 200th anniversary of the capture of Riga by Russian troops, commemorative medals, tokens and gifts were made, which Nicholas II personally distributed at a meeting with the Governor-General of Livonia.
