= Anikita Repnin =

Russian general (1668–1726)

Prince Anikita Repnin
- Аникита Репнин
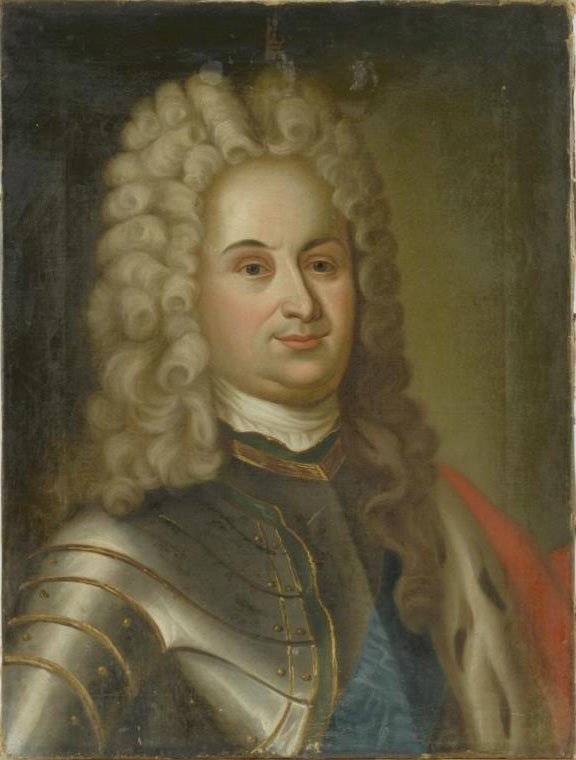
- Born: 1668; Moscow, Russia
- Died: 3 July 1726 (aged 57–58); Riga
- Military career
- Allegiance: Russia
- Rank: Field marshal
- Known for: Governor of Livland
- Conflicts: Great Northern War; Siege of Mitau; Battle of Holowczyn; Battle of Lesnaya; Battle of Poltava; Siege of Riga (1709–1710)

Prince Anikita Ivanovich Repnin (Russian: Аники́та Ива́нович Репни́н; 1668 – 3 July 1726, in Riga) was a Russian general during the Great Northern War who superintended the taking of Riga in 1710 and served as the Governor of Livonia from 1719 until his death.

== Life ==
Coming from the old Russian princely family Repnin, Anikita was one of the collaborators of Peter the Great, with whom he grew up. On the occasion of the Sophian insurrection of 1689, he carefully guarded Peter in the Troitsa Monastery, and subsequently took part in the Azov expedition, during which he was raised to the grade of general. He took part in all the principal engagements of the Great Northern War. Defeated by Charles XII at Holowczyn, he was degraded to the ranks, but was pardoned as a reward for his valour at Lesnaya and recovered all his lost dignities. At Poltava he commanded the centre.

From Ukraine, he was transferred to the Baltic Provinces and was made the first Governor-General of Riga after its capture in 1710. In 1724, he succeeded the temporarily disgraced favorite, Menshikov, as war minister. Catherine I made him a field-marshal.

== Marriage and children ==
He married twice and had 3 sons and one daughter, including

- Vasily Anikitovich Repnin (1696–1748), commander in chief of the Russian Army during the War of the Austrian Succession.

== Honours ==
- Poland–Lithuania: Order of the White Eagle
