= Nöteborg =

Nöteborg may refer to:

- The Swedish name for Shlisselburg, a town in Kirovsky District of Leningrad Oblast, Russia
- Battle of Nöteborg, 1702, one of the first sieges of the Great Northern War, when Russian forces captured the Swedish fortress of Nöteborg
- Siege of Nöteborg, 1656, a siege during the Russo-Swedish War (1656–58)
- Treaty of Nöteborg, 1323, a peace treaty signed at Orekhovets (Swedish: Nöteborg); the first settlement between Sweden and Novgorod Republic regulating their border
