= Siege of Nöteborg =

Siege of Nöteborg (also Noteborg, Noteburg) may refer to:

- Siege of Nöteborg (1656), Russo-Swedish War
- Siege of Nöteborg (1702), the capture of the Swedish fort by Russian forces during the Great Northern War
