= Battle of Systerbäck =

Battle in the Great Northern War

Coordinates: 60°07′16″N 29°58′41″E

- Part of the Great Northern War
Date	July 8, 1703 (O.S.); July 9, 1703 (Swedish calendar); July 19, 1703 (N.S.)
Location	Sestra River, Russia
Result	Russian victory

Belligerents
(Sweden) Swedish Empire	Tsardom of Russia

Commanders and leaders
(Sweden) Abraham Cronhjort	(Russia) Boris Sheremetev (Russia) Aleksandr Danilovich Menshikov

Strength
4,000 men	25,000 men of which 7,000–8,000 engaged

Casualties and losses
390 killed and wounded	150 killed and wounded

The Battle of Systerbäck took place on July 19, 1703 near the Sestra River during the Great Northern War. The Swedish army under the command of Abraham Cronhjort had to pull back to escape encirclement of the much larger Russian force under Boris Sheremetev. The two sides estimated their losses to 390 Swedish dead and wounded and 150 Russians dead and wounded.
