= Siege of Nöteborg (1702) =

1702 siege of the Great Northern War

Coordinates: 59.9500°N 31.0333°E

- Part of the Great Northern War
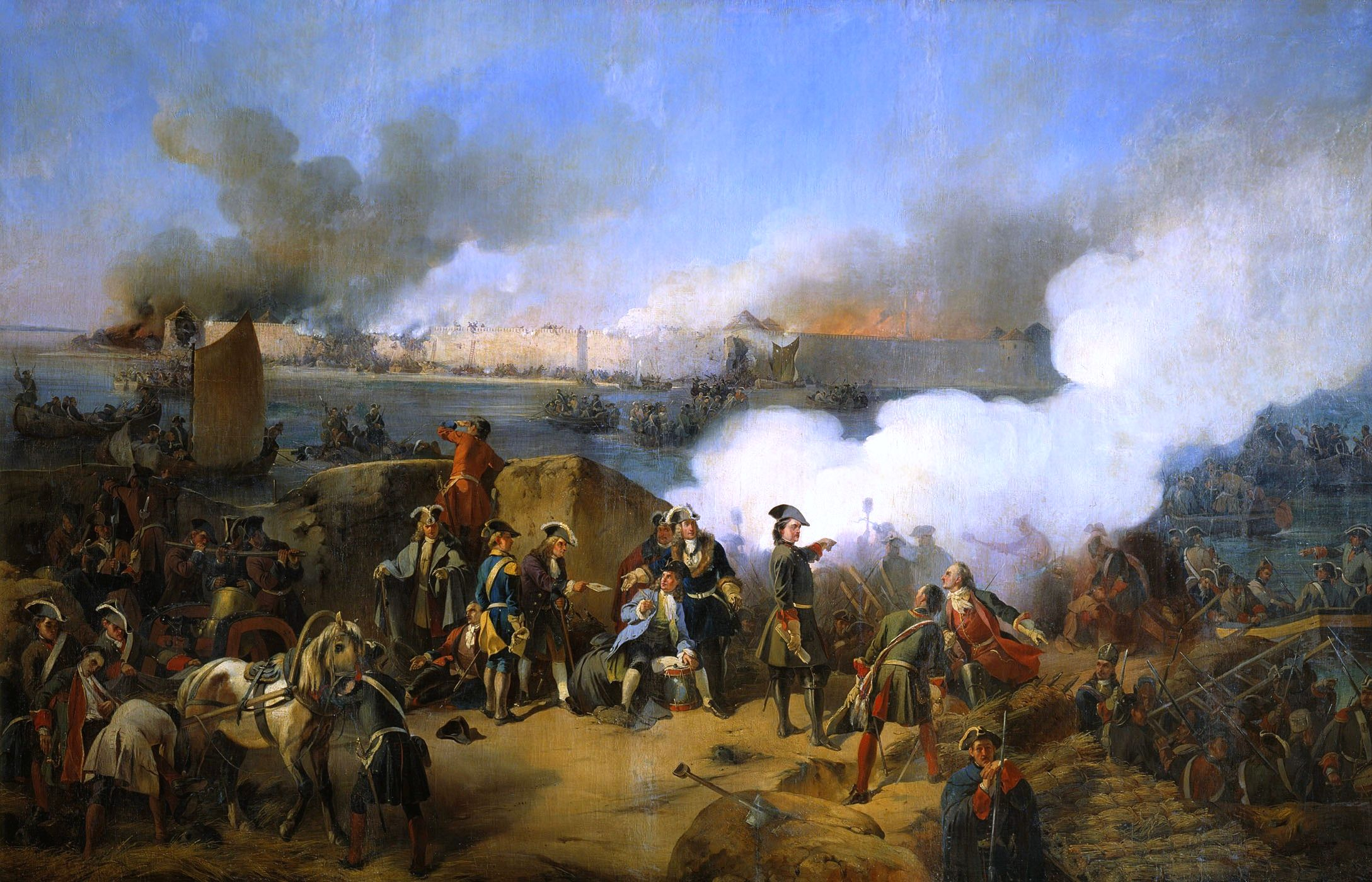
- The storm of Swedish fortress of Nöteborg by Russian troops. Czar Peter I is shown in the center.
Date	26 September – 11 October 1702 (O.S.); 27 September – 12 October 1702 (S.S.); 7–22 October 1702 (N.S.)
Location	Nöteborg, Swedish Empire, renamed Shlisselburg, Russian Empire (present-day Leningrad Oblast, Russia)
Result	Russian victory

Belligerents
(yes) Swedish Empire	Tsardom of Russia

Commanders and leaders
(Swedish Empire) Gustav Wilhelm von Schlippenbach (Swedish Empire) Hans Georg Leijon	(Tsardom of Russia) Peter I (Tsardom of Russia) Boris Sheremetev

Strength
About 440 soldiers 142 light artillery guns	12,500 men deployed, 20,000–35,000 in total 51 heavy artillery guns

Casualties and losses
200 killed, 156 wounded Total: About 360 casualties	538 killed, 925 wounded Total: About 1,500 casualties

The siege of Nöteborg was one of the first sieges of the Great Northern War, when Russian forces captured the Swedish fortress of Nöteborg (later renamed Shlisselburg) in October 1702. Peter the Great had assembled a force of 20,000 men for this task, and marched for ten days to his destination. About 12,000 of these men were positioned on the banks of the Neva river, where they camped until 6 October (N.S.). On that day, after giving command of the main force to Boris Sheremetev, he moved toward Nöteborg. After the Swedish commander, Wilhelm von Schlippenbach, refused to give up the fort immediately, the Russians began bombarding it. A final Russian assault on the fort was tactically unsuccessful, resulting in heavy casualties, but forced the fort's defenders to surrender on 22 October 1702. After taking control, Peter immediately began reconstructing the fort for his own purposes, renaming it Shlisselburg.

== Swedish defences ==
Nöteborg was initially defended by a small garrison of no more than 220 men, with 142 cannons of small caliber. However, during the course of the siege it was reinforced with about 240 men. Under the command of the old colonel Gustav Wilhelm von Schlippenbach, the brother of the Swedish general commanding in Livonia, Wolmar Anton von Schlippenbach. The last party of reinforcements arrived on 18 October under the command of Hans Georg Leijon; it consisted of about 50 grenadiers, only 34 of whom reached the fortress defence due to the shortage of boats. On Leijon's arrival only 225 remaining soldiers were fit for duty, the rest had been killed or wounded by the artillery bombardment, or suffered disease.

The defences of the fortress at that time consisted of a stone wall 28 feet high and 14 feet thick, with seven towers. Near the northeastern part of the fortress was a castle, which itself consisted of a stone wall and three towers. The main defence of the fortress was the Neva river itself, along with Lake Ladoga, which together encircled the entire fort. On the right bank of the Neva, about 3,000 yards (1.5 miles) from the main fort, there was a separate fortification, consisting of a sconce-type outwork, where a regiment was garrisoned to assist with communication with the main fort and transportation across the river.

== Siege ==
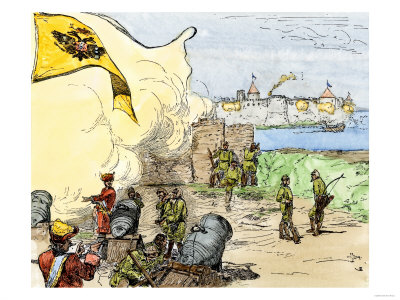
A later illustration of the siege

With a force then of about twelve thousand men, Peter the Great and his army advanced to lay siege to the fortress of Nöteborg. Nöteborg had originally been built by the people of Novgorod four centuries earlier, under the name of Orekhovo or Oreshek, on a small island of the river Neva, just where it flows out from Lake Ladoga. However, it has been said that Torgils Knutsson was the first one to have fortified the island. The island itself was in the shape of a hazel-nut, hence both the Russian and Swedish names. It served for a long time as a barrier against the incursions of the Swedes and Danes, and protected the commerce of Novgorod as well as of Ladoga.

A few days after arriving at Nöteborg, Peter sent a detachment of 400 men of the Preobrazhensky Regiment to take up positions closer to the fort and prepare for the arrival of a greater force. The troops destroyed two Swedish boats sent out for reconnaissance, but were fired upon from the fort. This did not stop them from performing their field preparations, and they lost only one man. The next day, the rest of the Preobrazhensky Regiment and Semenovsky Regiment arrived.

The remainder of the Russians took up positions on both sides of the River Neva by 7 October, and during the next several days they were busy constructing artillery batteries, which were completed by 12 October. The difficult job of securing the outwork on the Neva's bank was handed over to the Preobrazhensky Regiment, which, at four o'clock in the morning of 12 October, embarked towards the far coast of the river. Under the leadership of the Czar himself, the Russians were successful in capturing the sconce, encountering little resistance. Upon its capture, further construction work began, and eventually the town was besieged from all sides. Using a fleet of small boats, which they brought down from the river Svir through Lake Ladoga, the Russians succeeded in completely blockading the fort. They then sent a letter to the Swedish commandant, Wilhelm von Schlippenbach, requiring that he surrender the fort. Schlippenbach requested a four-day wait to allow him to consult with General Arvid Horn, his superior, who was in Narva; however Russian forces opened fire on the same day.

On 14 October the wife of the commandant sent a letter to the Russian field-marshal, in the name of the wives of the officers, asking that they be permitted to depart. Peter, wishing to lose no time, himself replied that he could not consent to put Swedish ladies to the discomfort of a separation from their husbands: if they desired to leave the fort, they could do so if they took their husbands with them.

On 15 October, 300 Russian soldiers occupied some small islands which were closer to the enemy fort, with the help of earthworks.

== Assault on the fort ==
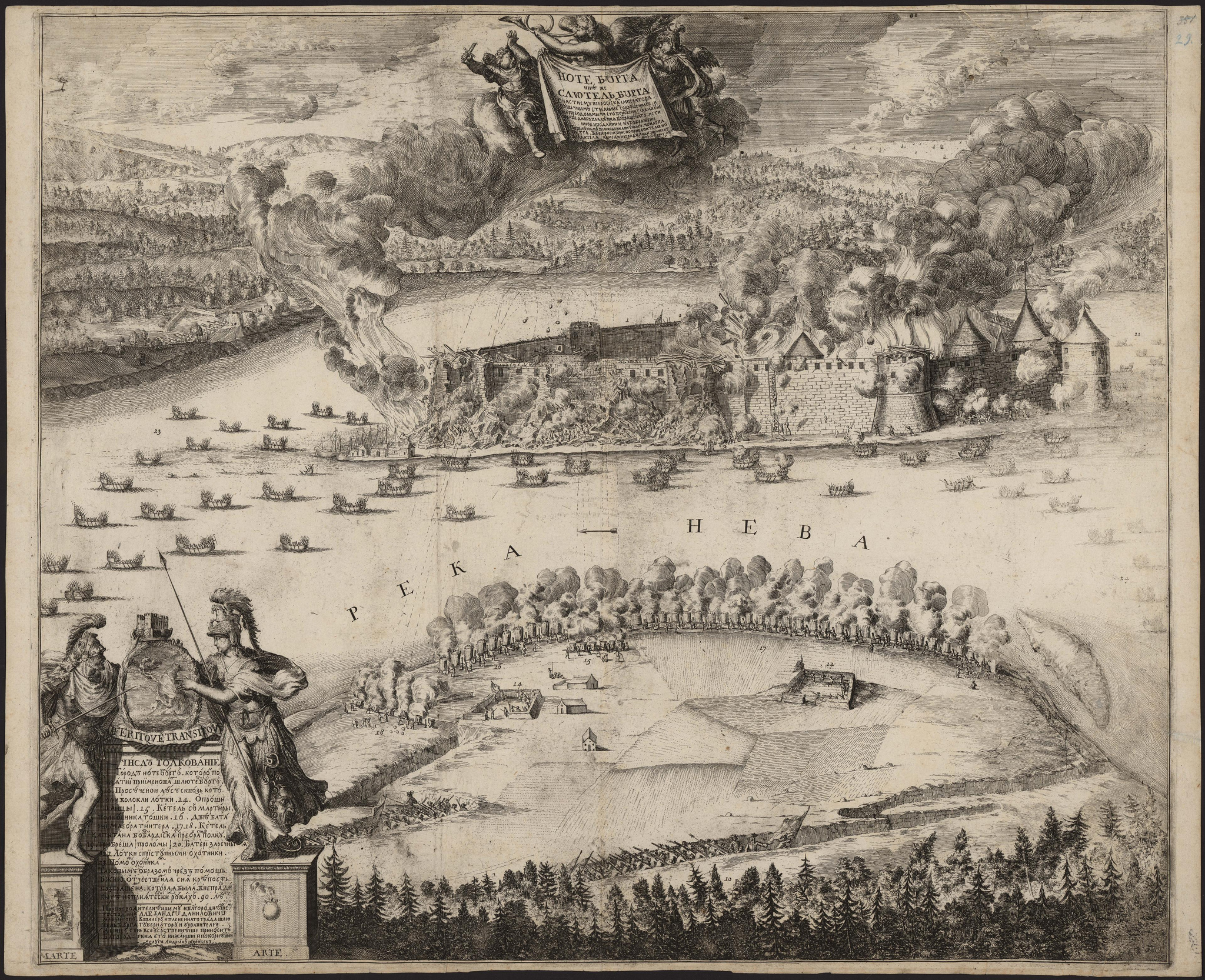
An engraving of the siege by A Schoonebeek, 1703

Preparations to perform a final assault on the fort began on 20 October; siege ladders were distributed, and officers were told where they would strike the fort. Finally, on 22 October, Peter decided to perform the assault. At one o'clock in the morning, a fire broke out in the fort. Local hunters and men from the Preobrazhensky Regiment, among others, waited at the ready in landing boats, two miles away from the fort. At half-past two, mortar shots were fired, which was the signal to commence the attack.

The Swedes deployed 95 men by the church roundel under the command of Major Leyon, and another 75 men by the basement roundel under the command of Major Charpentier. The remaining defenders spread out over the walls and fortifications. Schlippenbach had about 250 men under his command, which indicates that the Swedish had suffered about 200 casualties before the assault.

The Russians launched their first assault, Swedish eyes witnessed 5,000 Russians crossing the river in their landing boats. Constantly under fire from muskets and cannons, they made an attempt to scale the breached walls while having the fort surrounded. Eventually, however, the assault was repulsed, largely due to the help of the Swedish grenadiers.

In the second and third assaults, men from the Preobrazhensky and Semenovsky Regiments landed on the fort island and proceeded to erect escalades to scale the walls. The ladders turned out to be too short, but the attack continued. Fissures in the fortress wall formed choke points, and Russian troops took heavy casualties in their attempts to scale the fortress walls. Major Andrei Karpov was severely injured during the attack; Peter, upon receiving news of this and the other casualties, decided to call off the assault on the fort, but the orders did not reach the front lines. There are stories, considered unlikely, that Mikhail Golitsyn did, in fact, receive the orders, but refused to carry them out, telling the messenger to "tell the Czar that now I am not his, but God's," implying that it was too late to withdraw.

Golitsyn finally continued the attacks, and ordered the landing ships to depart, putting his troops in the position to choose either death or victory.

== Swedish surrender and aftermath ==
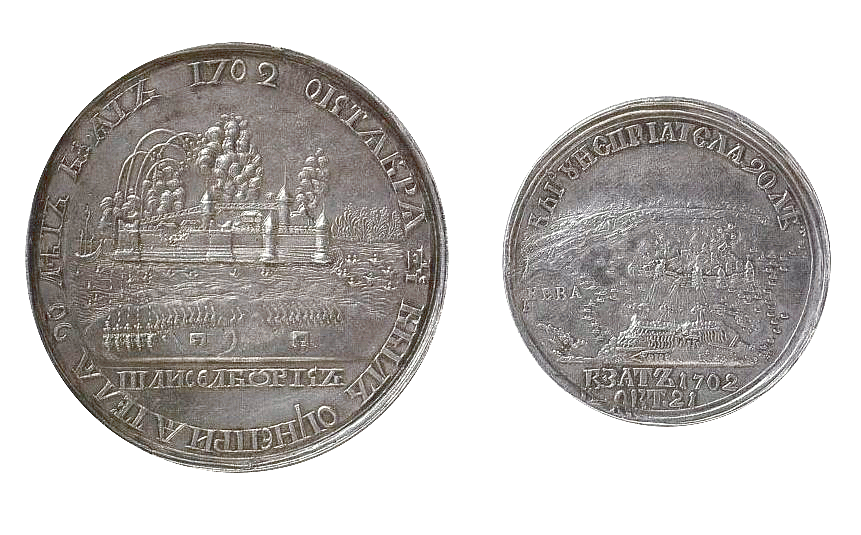
Silver medals awarded for the capture of Nöteborg

Following the unrelenting but relatively fruitless assault on the fort by Russian forces, which lasted for 13 hours, the Swedish commandant accepted to capitulate on honorable conditions, realizing he could not defend the fortress for much longer. By then, the Russians had been able to take up position below one of the towers and had started mining. Another Russian force had managed to capture some houses just outside the gate, but these were set on fire by a Swedish detachment. To avoid massacre, Schlippenbach's whole garrison, with all their property, were allowed to depart to the next Swedish fort. According to Swedish sources, 83 soldiers left the Nöteborg fortress in "good condition to fight", taking another 156 wounded or sick. They took four light artillery guns, leaving 138 remaining pieces behind. The Russians had lost more men than the whole Swedish garrison, in all almost 600 dead and around 1,000 wounded. Swedish sources mentions more than 2,000 Russian losses during the assault, and a total of 6,000 during the whole siege.

Peter immediately proceeded to repair the damage done to the fort, renaming it Shlisselburg (from German Schlüsselburg – "key-city"). In the western bastion, the key given him by the Swedish commandant, a symbol that this fort was the key to the Neva, was built into the wall. When Peter was in St. Petersburg, he went to Schlisselburg every 2 November and feasted the capitulation. Alexander Danilovich Menshikov who had shown great military ability, was appointed governor of the newly named fort, and from this time dates his intimate friendship with Peter and his prominence in public life.
