= Siege of Kyzykermen (1695) =

Russian victory in the Great Turkish War

- Part of Russo-Turkish War (1686–1700) and Great Turkish War
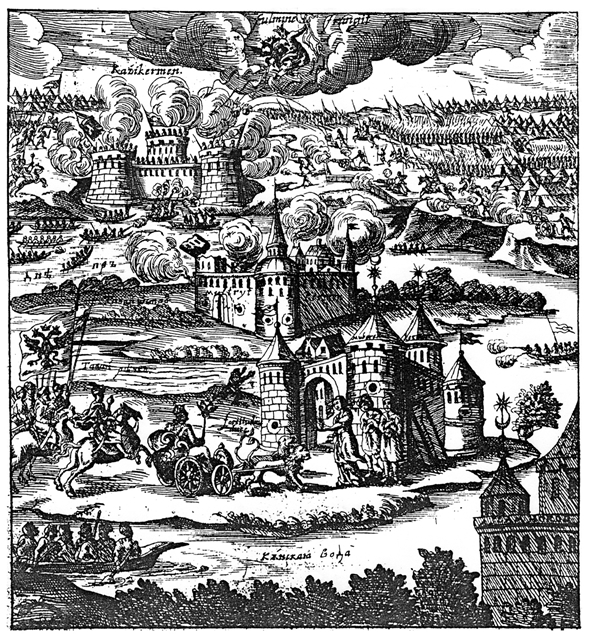
- The capture of Kyzykermen by Russo-Cossack forces
Date	24 July – 17 August 1695
Location	Kyzykermen fortress on the Dnieper, Ottoman Empire (now Beryslav, Ukraine)
Result	Russo–Cossack victory
Territorial changes	Russians and Cossacks capture Kyzykermen

Belligerents
Tsardom of Russia; Cossack Hetmanate	Ottoman Empire; Crimean Khanate

Commanders and leaders
(Tsardom of Russia) Boris Sheremetev; Ivan Mazepa	(Ottoman Empire) Bey of Kyzykermen (surrendered)

Strength
68,000 to 120,000; (Tsardom of Russia) 31,000–36,000; 37,000	(Ottoman Empire) 4,000; Unknown (Note: Crimean Khan Selim Giray sent several thousand warriors, but they were subsequently unable to join the siege.)

Casualties and losses
(Tsardom of Russia) Unknown	(Ottoman Empire) 2,000 to 2,500

The Siege of Kyzykermen (Note: Russian: Осада Кызыкермена, romanized: Osada Kyzykermena; Ukrainian: Облога Кизикермена, romanized: Obloha Kyzykermena; Turkish: Kızıkerme Kuşatması) was a military action carried out by the Russian army led by Boris Sheremetev, jointly with Ukrainian Cossacks of Ivan Mazepa, against the Ottoman fortress Kyzykermen (now Beryslav, Ukraine), as a part of the ongoing Great Turkish War. The Russo-Cossack army besieged the fortress in July and captured it after several weeks on 17 August.

The fortress and three smaller adjacent forts were a key Ottoman outpost in the region, controlling the Dnieper routes. Although Azov was officially the primary objective of the 1695 campaign, the Dnieper theater of military operations effectively became the primary one. It was in this direction that the largest number of troops were deployed and the main successes were achieved.

== Background ==
In 1686, Russian Tsardom joined the Great Turkish War and declared war on the Ottoman Empire. Initial Russian attempts to conquer Crimea in 1687 and 1689 ended in a failure, after which Russia focused on another major goal, which was the fortress of Azov. In early 1695, Russian army began preparing for a future expedition to Azov. In a parallel, the Russians planned to launch an additional campaign on the Dnieper to divert a major Ottoman-Tatar force from Azov. According to Gus'kov, Kochegarov and Shamin, the total strength of the Russo-Cossack army ranged from 68,000 to 73,000 men, according to Oglobnin and Kostomarov, the army 100,000-strong, while some sources estimate the strength of Russo-Cossack army to 120,000 people, although the latter numbers are considered to be an exaggeration. It was led by boyarin Boris Sheremetev and a Cossack hetman Ivan Mazepa, who at the time struggled against a Pro-Crimean hetman Petryk Ivanenko. The main objective of this campaign was the fortress of Kyzykermen (modern Beryslav), which was previously raided by Paliy's Cossacks in 1693 and 1694, which were successful, since a lot of historians consider the main Cossack goal during these campaigns was to devastate the Ottoman and Tatar cities. On 10 May, Sheremetev went from Belgorod to Kolomak, while Mazepa left Baturyn one week later and united with Sheremetev's troops at Perevolochna. By mid-July, the allies had approached Kyzykermen. Before the main campaign started, Zaporozhian Cossacks had committed a series of small-scale raids on the Dnieper.

== Forces ==
The Russo-Cossack army numbered about 70,000 men, including Sheremetev's regular Russian regiments and Mazepa's Cossack detachments. Sheremetev's corps consisted of three voivodeship regiments (his own and those of two of his comrades, the Duma nobleman Semyon Neplyuev and stolnik Ilya Dmitriev-Mamonov). The cavalry of the "new order" was commanded by Lieutenant General A. A. Tsey, and the soldier regiments were commanded by Lieutenant General Ivan (Yagan) Andreevich Gulits. The core of the corps was the Belgorod Razriad, reinforced by units of the Smolensk and Moscow Discharge Regiments. Later, about 2,000 Zaporozhian Cossacks joined the marching army.

The Ottoman garrison consisted of about 4,000 men, well-fortified within a fortress with powerful walls and artillery. Crimean Khan Selim Giray sent several thousand warriors, but they were subsequently unable to join the siege.

== Siege ==
The first to appear at Kyzykermen, unexpectedly for the defenders, was the "floating army." It isolated the fortresses from each other, prevented the dispatch of messengers, and captured the local fleet, making it impossible for the Tatar troops to organize a crossing. Then the main army approached Kyzykermen. According to Sheremetev's "report," the siege of Kyzykermen began on the evening of July 24, 1695; according to Mazepa's documents, on July 25; and the Velichko Chronicle lists the last Wednesday of July, which corresponds to July 23 according to the Old Style.

The Russo-Cossack army surrounded the fortress, beginning siege work: digging trenches (under the direction of the German engineer Otto Friedrich Fonschwengel), setting up artillery, and preparing for an assault. Mining began under the fortress wall. Russian artillery began shelling, attempting to destroy the fortifications. Turkish attacks were successfully repelled. Mining under the walls allowed them to blow up part of the fortifications, weakening the defenses. On July 30, after the wall had been undermined and fires in the fortress had triggered a series of explosions, Russo-Cossack forces launched an assault, which resulted in the capture of the "large city" after a five-hour battle. The defenders retreated to the "smaller city" with heavy losses, but their situation was hopeless and they capitulated a day later. The garrison's leading officers and 14 cannons were captured.

In addition to Kyzykermen, the neighboring, smaller fortresses of Kakhovka, Mubarakkermen, and Mustritkermen (Tavansky Gorodok) were also captured, which was a significant success. Their garrisons, shaken by the fall of Kyzykermen, surrendered or fled. Ottoman losses are known to have amounted to 2,000 to 2,500, while the exact Russian and Cossack losses are unknown.

== Aftermath ==
The Dnieper campaign, unlike the first campaign at Azov, ended with a decisive victory for the Allies, leading to a capture of over 14 fortresses on the Lower Dnieper region. In 1697, the Ottomans, with the help of the Crimeans, attempted to recapture Kyzykermen and Tavan. Yusuf Pasha approached the fortresses and was joined by the Crimean army. Local skirmishes ensued, and soon the Ottomans began a siege. The siege was unsuccessful, and the Ottomans retreated after several unsuccessful assaults. The reason for this was the inclusion of the Tatars in the campaign. Although they were skilled at screening the Ottomans from surprise attacks, they were still weak at storming fortifications. Russian losses are known to have amounted to 602 killed and 1,185 wounded, while the exact Ottoman losses are unknown. The following year, the Russians constantly heard reports that the Ottomans were preparing to attack and that they had assembled a large army; according to rumors, Sultan Mustafa II himself would join the campaign. But it turned out that the Ottomans had assembled even fewer forces than the previous year, and the Russians had a clear advantage. The Ottomans did not dare to launch a campaign. In 1698, there were only small Crimean attacks and local skirmishes. Kyzykermen was ceded back to the Ottoman Empire per the treaty of Constantinople in 1700.

== Sources ==
- Tairova-Yakovleva, Tatiana (2020). Ivan Mazepa and the Russian Empire. Canada: McGill-Queen's University Press. ISBN 9780228003083.
- Gus'kov, Andrei; Kochegarov, Kiril; Shamin, Stepan (2022). Русско-Турецкая война 1686-1700 [The Russo-Turkish War of 1686-1700] (PDF). Moscow: Русское слово. ISBN 978-5-533-02732-8.
- Bagro, Alyona Viktorovna (2015). Украинское казачество и первый Азово-Днепровский поход [Ukrainian Cossackdom and the First Azov-Dnieper campaign] (PDF). Saint Petersburg: Институт истории Санкт-Петербургского государственного университета.
- Tairova-Yakovleva, Tatiana (2007). Мазепа [Mazepa] (in Russian). Moscow: Molodaya Gvardiya (publisher). ISBN 978-5-235-02966-8.
- Guskov, A. G.; Shamin, S. M. (2021). "Оборона днепровских городков в 1697 году – ключевой эпизод русско-турецкой войны 1686–1700 годов" (PDF). Vestnik VGU. Series: History. Political Science. Sociology (3). Archived (PDF) from the original on 2025-04-25.
