= Battle of Hummelshof =

1702 engagement during the Great Northern War

Coordinates: 57.7833°N 26.0333°E

- Part of the Great Northern War
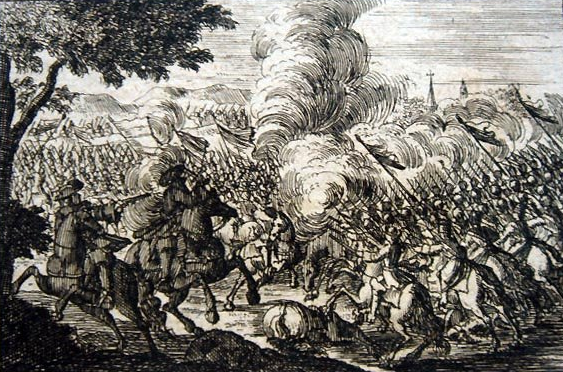
- Anonymous copperplate of the battle (1733)
Date	18 July 1702 (O.S.); 19 July 1702 (Swedish calendar); 29 July 1702 (N.S.)
Location	Hummelshof, Swedish Livonia (present-day Hummuli, Estonia)
Result	Russian victory

Belligerents
(yes) Swedish Empire	Tsardom of Russia

Commanders and leaders
(Swedish Empire) Wolmar Anton von Schlippenbach	(Tsardom of Russia) Boris Sheremetev

Strength
6,000–8,000; 17 artillery pieces	20,000–23,969 men 24 artillery pieces

Casualties and losses
2,000 killed and over 1,000 wounded and captured or 5,500 killed and wounded, all cannons	1,000–4,000 killed and wounded

Battle of Hummelshof took place on 18 July 1702 (O.S.) near the small town Hummelshof in Swedish Livonia (present-day Estonia). It was the second significant Russian victory in the Great Northern War in which a Russian army under Boris Sheremetev attacked a much smaller force under Wolmar Anton von Schlippenbach and defeated it after experiencing similar casualties to the Swedes. This was a final blow to the Swedish force defending Livonia and the defeat left it fully open to Russian attacks.
