= Battle of Rauge =

1701 military conflict in Estonia during Great Northern War

- Part of the Great Northern War
Date	4 September 1701 (O.S.); 5 September 1701 (Swedish calendar); 15 September 1701 (N.S.)
Location	Rauge, Swedish Livonia (present-day Rõuge, Estonia) 57°43′40″N 26°54′35″E
Result	Swedish victory

Belligerents
(yes) Swedish Empire	Tsardom of Russia

Commanders and leaders
(Swedish Empire) Wolmar Anton von Schlippenbach	(Tsardom of Russia) Boris Sheremetev

Strength
2,000 men	7,000 men

Casualties and losses
100 killed and wounded	at least 2,000 killed, wounded and captured

The Battle of Rauge took place on 15 September 1701 near Rõuge, Livonia during the Great Northern War in which the Swedes defeated the numerically superior Russians.
