= Battle of Poltava =

1709 battle of the Great Northern War

- Part of the Swedish invasion of Russia during the Great Northern War
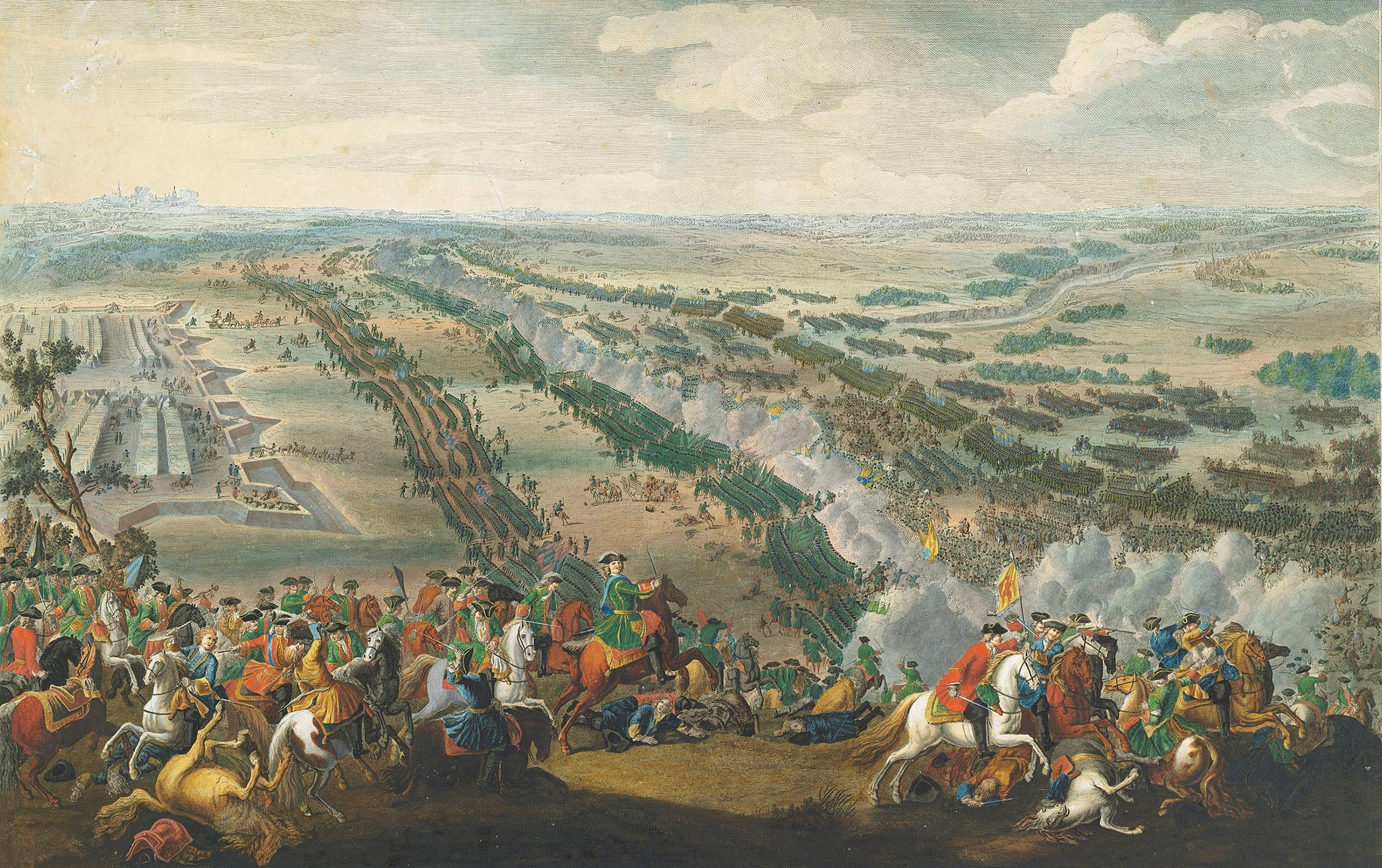
- The Battle of Poltava by Pierre-Denis Martin
| Date | 8 July 1709 (Note: Also 27 June 1709 in Julian calendar and 28 June 1709 in Swedish calendar.) |
| Location | Poltava, Cossack Hetmanate (present-day Ukraine) 49°37′53″N 34°33′10″E |
| Result | Russian coalition victory |

Belligerents
| (yes) Swedish Empire; Cossack Hetmanate | Tsardom of Russia; Cossack Hetmanate; Kalmyk Khanate |

Commanders and leaders
| (Swedish Empire) Charles XII (WIA) (Swedish Empire) Carl Gustav Rehnskiöld (POW) (Swedish Empire) Carl Gustaf Creutz (POW) (Swedish Empire) Adam Ludwig Lewenhaupt (Swedish Empire) Hugo Johan Hamilton (POW) (Swedish Empire) Wolmar Anton von Schlippenbach (POW) (Swedish Empire) Carl Gustaf Roos (POW); Ivan Mazepa | (Tsardom of Russia) Peter I (Tsardom of Russia) Boris Sheremetev (Tsardom of Russia) Alexander Menshikov (Tsardom of Russia) Jacob Bruce; Ivan Skoropadsky; Semyon Paliy |

Strength
| 31,392; 34 artillery pieces: 16,500 in battle (Note: 8,700 infantry 7,800 cavalry) 4 cannons (Note: Besieging Poltava: 1,100 to 3,000 infantry 200 cavalry Egorshina & Petrova 2023, p. 62) | 75,000 (Note: 52,100 Russian regulars (33,500 infantry 18,600 cavalry) 23,000 irregulars (Cossacks and Kalmyks, 3,000 Kalmyks arrived at the end of the battle)) to 80,000; 102 artillery pieces: 42,660 in battle (Note: 24,500 infantry 14,600 dragoons 3,000 Kalmyks) 86 cannons (Note: Garrison of Poltava: 4,200 infantry 2,000 Cossacks and 28 cannons) |

Casualties and losses
| 9,700 to 12,211 (Note: Swedish accounts: 6,900 killed and wounded, 2,800 captured.; Russian accounts: 9,234 killed, 2,864–2,977 captured.; Others accounts: 7,800 killed and 2,977 captured) | 4,635 to 5,953 (Note: Official accounts: 1,345 killed, 3,290 wounded. (Note: The number of dead may rise to 1,572, then the total losses will be 4,863 Krotov 2014, p. 420); Other accounts: 5,953 killed and wounded.) |
- Location within Ukraine Battle of Poltava (European Russia)

The Battle of Poltava (Note: Swedish: Slaget vid Poltava; Russian: Полта́вская би́тва; Ukrainian: Полта́вська би́тва) fought on 8 July 1709, (Note: 28 June according to the then-used Swedish calendar; 27 June in the Julian calendar; 8 July in the Gregorian (modern) calendar.) was the decisive and largest battle of the Great Northern War. A Russian army under the command of Tsar Peter I defeated a Swedish army commanded by Carl Gustaf Rehnskiöld. The battle would lead to the Swedish Empire losing its status as a European great power and also marked the beginning of Russian supremacy in eastern Europe.

During the course of six years in the initial stages of the war, King Charles XII and the Swedish Empire had defeated almost all participants in the anti-Swedish coalition, which initially consisted of the Polish-Lithuanian Commonwealth, Denmark-Norway and the Tsardom of Russia. The latter, under Tsar Peter I, was the only one still fighting. Charles therefore chose to invade Russia in the autumn of 1707 and march towards Moscow with a large Swedish army. However, the campaign was complicated by harsh weather conditions and by Russian scorched earth tactics and surprise attacks, which forced Charles to interrupt his march on Moscow and instead march south to establish winter quarters with the help of Ivan Mazepa, hetman of the Cossack Hetmanate Zaporizhian Host.

After the extremely harsh Great Frost of 1708–1709, which was the coldest recorded winter in Europe, the weakened Swedish army resumed operations in the spring of 1709 and besieged the fortress of Poltava, an important trading center and military depot on the Vorskla. Meanwhile, a numerically superior Russian army of 75,000–80,000 men commanded by Peter, advanced to Poltava to relieve the siege. The two armies clashed, and the Swedes were defeated and fled the battlefield. Charles and Mazepa retreated with 1,500 men south to the river Dnieper, which they crossed, thus managing to escape the Russians, and established themselves in the Ottoman Empire. The rest of the army was forced to surrender to the Russians at the village of Perevolochna on 11 July 1709.

The Battle of Poltava, as well as the subsequent capitulation, ended in a decisive victory for Peter I and became the greatest military catastrophe in Swedish history. It marked a turning point in the continuation of the war in favour of the anti-Swedish coalition, which as a result of the battle was revived and with renewed vigor attacked the weakened Swedish Empire on several fronts. Poltava thus marked the end of Sweden's time as the dominant power in the Baltic region, a position which after the war was taken over by the Russian Empire. The battle is therefore of crucial importance in the history of Sweden as well as Russia and Ukraine.

== Background ==
Charles XII had led Swedish forces to early victories in North Zealand (summer 1700) and in the Battle of Narva in November 1700. However, it took six years for him to defeat Augustus II of Saxony-Poland. Peter I withdrew from Poland in the spring of 1706, and offered to return the Baltic provinces of Sweden that Russia had occupied since 1703 - except for Ingria, where Peter had already started to build his intended new capital of St. Petersburg - but Charles refused. Peter subsequently adopted a scorched-earth policy in order to deprive the Swedish forces of supplies.

Charles ordered a final attack on the Russian heartland with a possible assault on Moscow from his campaign base in Poland. The Swedish army of almost 44,000 men left Saxony on 22 August 1707 and marched slowly eastwards. Charles took the field in November after waiting for reinforcements to arrive. Continuing east, he crossed the Vistula River on 25 December 1707, then continued through hostile Masuria and took Grodno on 26 January 1708 after Russian troops had abandoned the city. At the time the Russians were occupied with a large rebellion of Don Cossacks, known as the Bulavin Rebellion (1707–1708). This revolt was contained in part by the forces of the Cossack Hetmanate led by Hetman Ivan Mazepa. The Swedes continued to the area around Smorgon and Minsk, where the army went into winter quarters. Charles left 8,000 dragoons under Major General Ernst Detlof von Krassow in western Poland.

Poor weather and road conditions kept the Swedish troops in winter quarters until June 1708. In July the Swedes defeated Marshal Boris Sheremetyev's forces at the Battle of Holowczyn and advanced to the Dnieper River. During the spring General Lewenhaupt in Courland had been ordered to gather supplies and march his army of about 12,000 men to join Charles' forces. However, his departure from Mitau was delayed until late June and consequently he only joined Charles' forces on 11 October.

Rather than winter in Livonia or wait for Lewenhaupt, Charles decided to move southwards into Ukraine and join Mazepa, who had decided to rebel against Peter. Peter sent Boris Sheremetev to shadow the Swedish army. Lewenhaupt followed south and was attacked while crossing a river near a small village that gave its name to the Battle of Lesnaya, losing the supply train and half of his force. In need of resupply, Charles moved towards Baturyn, Mazepa's headquarters, but Russian troops under Aleksandr Menshikov reached the city first. Anticipating the Swedish arrival, Menshikov ordered the merciless massacre of the population, razing the city and destroying or looting arms, ammunition and food.

== Prelude ==
By the spring of 1709, Charles' force had shrunk to half of its original size. After the coldest winter in Europe in over 500 years, Charles was left with 20,000 soldiers and 34 cannons. Short of supplies, he laid siege to the Russian fortress at Poltava on the Vorskla River on 2 May 1709. Peter's force of 80,000 marched to relieve the siege. Upon his arrival, Peter built a fortified camp on the Vorskla, 4 km north of Poltava. While observing the Russian position on 20 June, Charles was struck in the foot by a stray bullet that wounded him so severely that he could not stand. In addition, Charles' last hope of reinforcement expired, as the Swedish forces under von Krassow had turned aside to deal with the anti-Swedish Sandomierz Confederation in Poland.

Between the Russian and Swedish forces the Yakovetski and Budyschenski woods formed a corridor, which the Russians defended by building six forts across the gap. Peter, in addition, ordered four more redoubts built so the entire system of ten forts would have a T shape, providing flanking fire to a Swedish advance. Two of the redoubts were still being constructed on the morning of the battle, but 4,000 Russians manned the remaining eight, with 10,000 cavalry under General Aleksandr Danilovich Menshikov stationed behind them.

== Battle ==
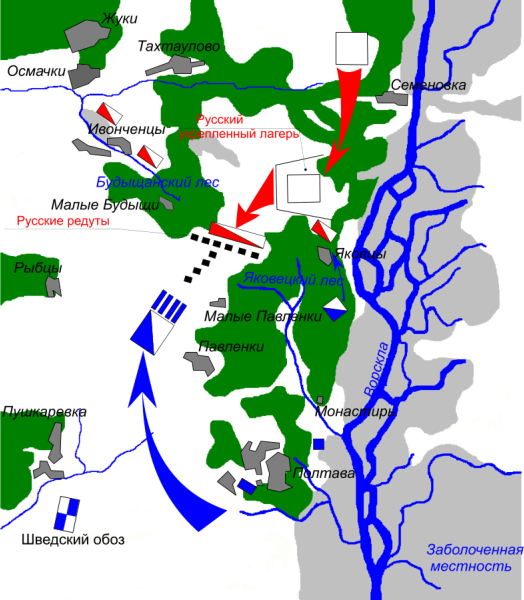
Initial dispositions. The Swedish forces are in blue, while the Russian forces are in red

Because of his wound, Charles turned over operational command to Field Marshal Carl Gustav Rehnskiöld. Four columns of infantry and six columns of cavalry were to form during the night, 600 meters south of the redoubts, intending to attack before dawn in order to swiftly bypass the redoubt system and hit the Russian fort. The infantry was in place by 2:30 a.m. but the cavalry arrived late, having lost their way. Riding forward, Axel Gyllenkrok observed the Russians at work on the two nearest redoubts and rode back to inform Rehnskiöld. A reconnoitre by Major General Wolmar Anton von Schlippenbach was discovered by the Russians and the alarm was sounded by the firing of a pistol. Having lost the element of surprise, and without sufficient cannon to breach the fortifications, Rehnskiöld consulted with Charles, Carl Piper and Lewenhaupt on whether or not to proceed with the assault. By the time Rehnskiöld decided to proceed with the attack by quoting, "In the name of God then, let us go forward", it was nearly 4:00 a.m. on 28 June (Swedish calendar) and dawn was already approaching. The Swedes in Carl Gustaf Roos' column quickly overran the first two redoubts, killing every Russian soldier inside them, but by 4:30 a.m. the attempts to take the third redoubt stalled.

Lewenhaupt's ten battalions on the right bypassed the first four redoubts entirely, advancing to the back line and, with the aid of cavalry, took some redoubts while bypassing others. Two of Roos' rear battalions joined them, indicating that issued orders lacked clarity as to whether to avoid the redoubts or attack them in series. The cavalry on the left wing, commanded by Major General Hamilton and an infantry regiment, advanced by passing the redoubts on the left and charged the Russian cavalry, forcing them to retreat. It was 5:00 a.m. when the left and right wings of the Swedish army made it past the back line of redoubts, sending the Russian cavalry in retreat. However, Rehnskiöld ordered his cavalry to stop their pursuit and Lewenhaupt, already advancing towards the fort, to withdraw to the west. There they awaited Roos' battalions for two hours, while the Russian cavalry and Ivan Skoropadsky's Cossacks waited to the north, with 13 Russian battalions deployed north of their camp and ten to the south, anticipating a Swedish advance.

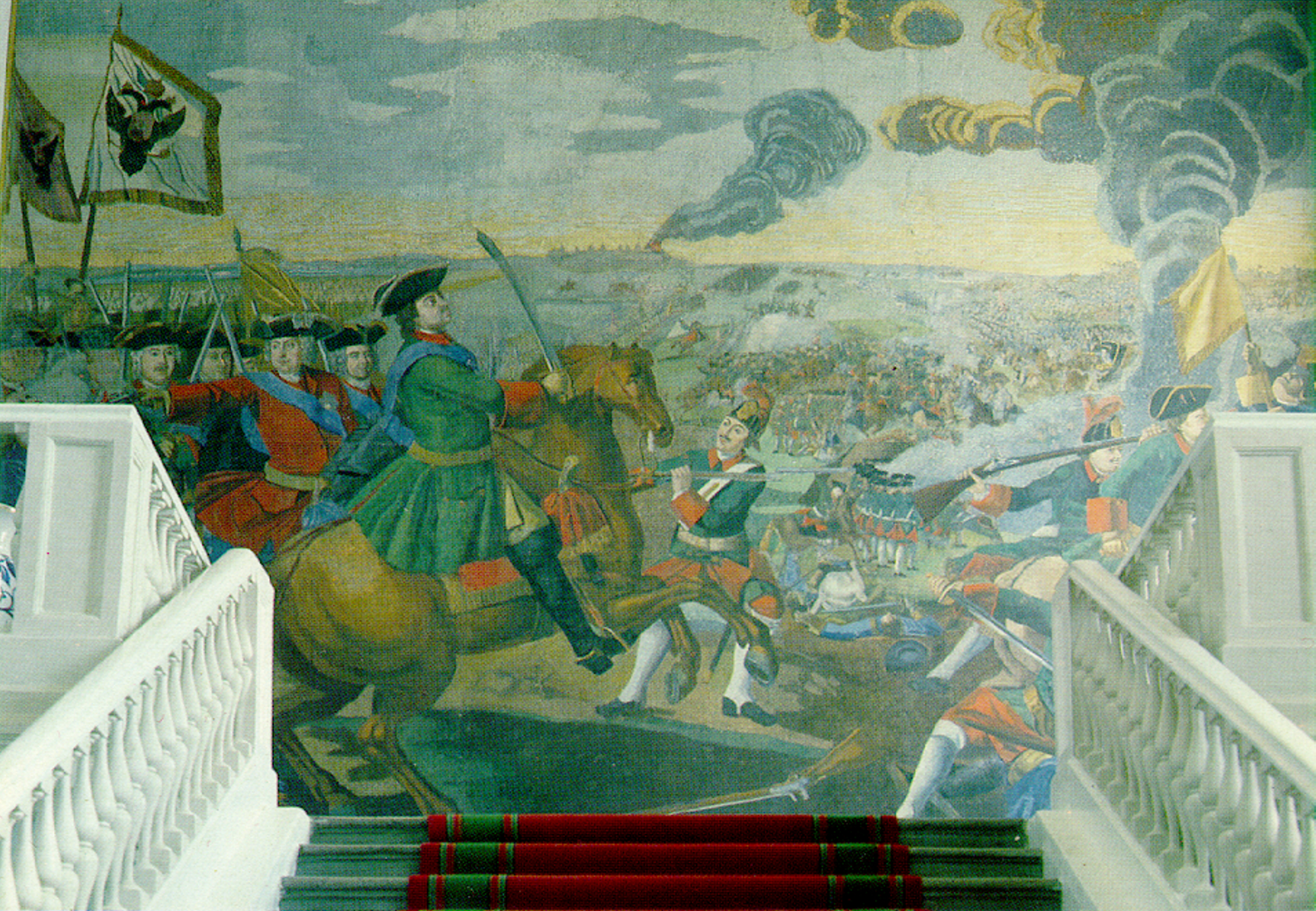
The Battle of Poltava, mosaic by Mikhail Lomonosov

General Roos and six battalions (one-third of the Swedish infantry) became isolated while attempting to take the third Russian redoubt. After suffering severe casualties from several assault attempts, Roos led the remaining 1,500 of his original 2,600 men into the Yakovetski woods to the east at 6:00 a.m. The Russians reoccupied the first two redoubts and launched a two-pronged attack by ten regiments around 7:00 a.m., forcing Roos to retreat towards Poltava and take refuge in an abandoned fort by 9:00 a.m. when he could not make it to the Swedish siege works. Roos was forced to surrender at 9:30 a.m.

The Swedes continued to wait for Roos' troops to return, unaware of their surrender. Peter led the 42 battalions of Russian infantry—22,000 soldiers—into an advance out of the fortified camp, supported by 55 three-pounder cannons and 32 guns on the ramparts of the fort. Ten regiments of dragoons formed under Lieutenant General Adolf Fredrik Bauer on the Russian right and six regiments under Menshikov on the left. Just west of the camp the Russians were faced by 4,000 Swedish infantry, formed into ten battalions with four three-pounders, and the cavalry under Major General Carl Gustaf Creutz in the rear. The Russians slowly moved forward to engage. According to Charles and reports from other Swedish officers, the weather at that time was already very hot and humid, with the sun obscured by smoke from the Russian cannons in the fort.

At 09:45, Rehnskiöld ordered Lewenhaupt and the Swedish line to move forward, advancing towards the Russian line, which started firing its cannons at 500 meters. When the Swedes were 50 meters from the Russian line, the Russians opened fire with their muskets from all four ranks. Advancing to within 30 meters of the Russian line, the Swedes fired a volley of their own and charged with their muskets and pikemen, and the Russian first line retreated towards their second line. The Swedes seemed to be on the verge of a breakthrough and needed the cavalry under Creutz to break the Russian lines. Unfortunately for the Swedes, Creutz's and the other cavalry units were unable to reform completely in time. With the Russian line longer than the Swedish line, the Swedish infantry on the left flank lagged behind the right and finally threw down their weapons and fled. As the Swedish right flank was still advancing, a gap began to open in the Swedish line which the Russians filled and the battle turned into a Cannae variation. Barely able to gather his cavalry squadrons, Creutz tried to advance on the right flank, but the Russian battalions were able to form into hollow squares, while Menshikov's cavalry outflanked the Swedes and attacked them from the rear. At this point the Swedish assault had disintegrated and no longer had organized bodies of troops to oppose the Russian infantry or cavalry. Small groups of soldiers managed to break through and escape to the south through the Budyschenski woods, while many of the rest were overwhelmed, ridden down or captured.

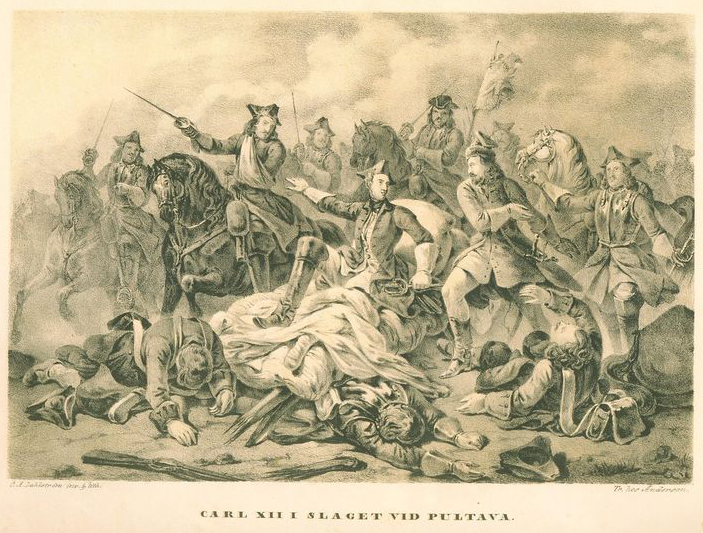
Charles XII at the Battle of Poltava by Carl Andreas Dahlström

Realizing they were the last Swedes on the battlefield, Charles ordered a retreat to the woods, gathering what remaining forces he could for protection, including the remnants of Creutz's detachment. The Russians halted at the edge of the woods and their artillery fire stopped; only the Cossacks and Kalmyks roamed the plains south of the woods. Emerging from the woods at around noon, Charles—on horseback after his litter was destroyed, and protected by a square of a couple of thousand men—headed to Pushkaryovka and his baggage train 5 km to the south, reaching it after 1:00 p.m., by which time the battle was over.

Charles gathered the remainder of his troops and baggage train and retreated to the south later that same day—at about 7:00 p.m., abandoning the siege of Poltava. Lewenhaupt led the surviving Swedes and some of the Cossack forces to the Dnieper River, but was doggedly pursued by the Russian regular cavalry and 3,000 Kalmyk auxiliaries and forced to surrender three days later at Perevolochna on 11 July.

== Aftermath ==
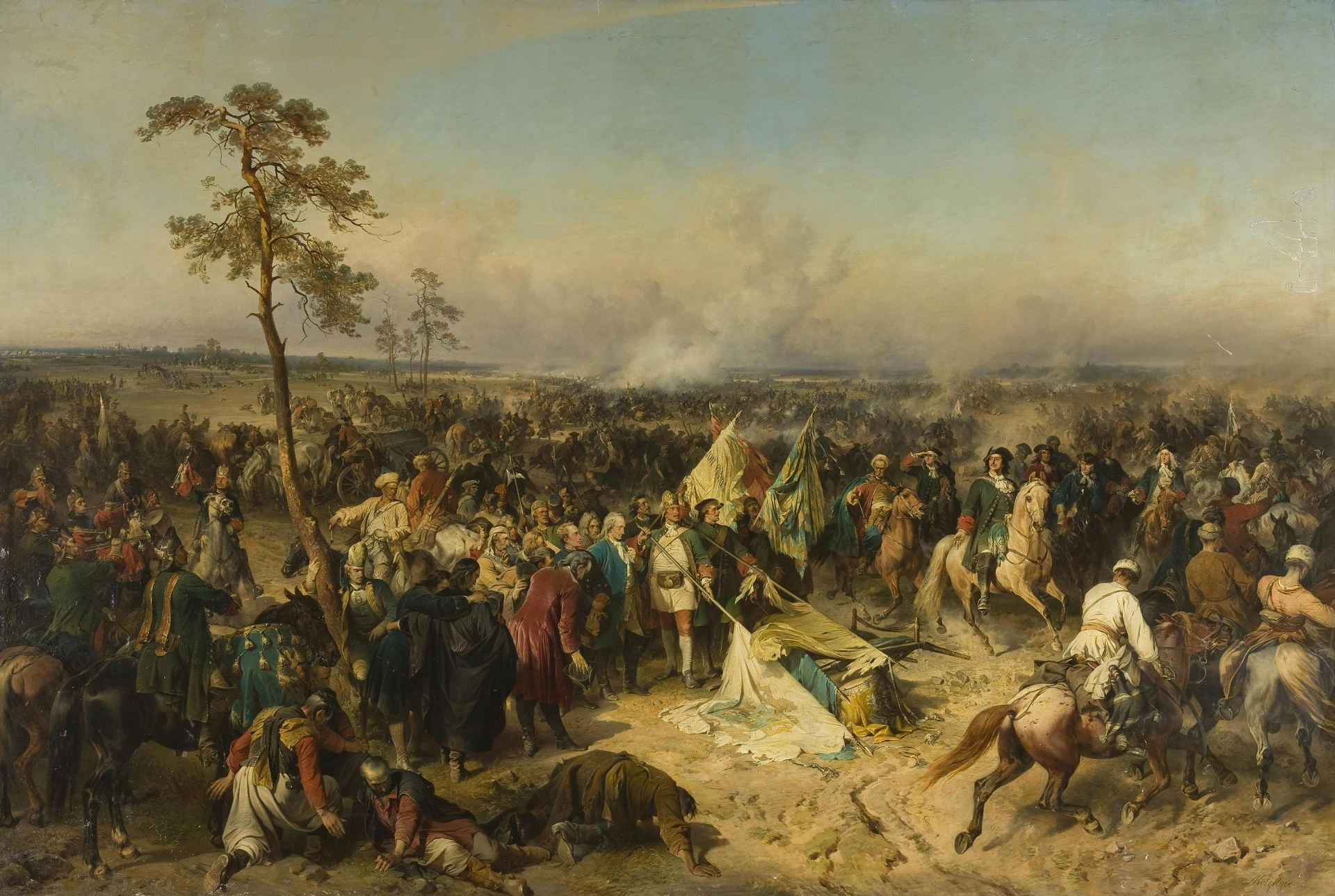
The Victory at Poltava by Alexander Kotzebue

High-ranking Swedes captured during the battle included Field Marshal Rehnskiöld, Major Generals Schlippenbach, Stackelberg, Hamilton and Prince Maximilian Emanuel, as well as Piper. Peter held a celebratory banquet in two large tents erected on the battlefield. Voltaire assumed Peter's reason for this, in raising a toast to the Swedish generals as war masters, was to send a message to his own generals about disloyalty. Two mass graves contained the Russian dead, 500 meters southwest of their camp. Previously when defeating Peter, Charles had gone so far as to pay the Russian troops. Peter instead took many Swedes, with great pride, and sent them to Siberia.

Charles and Mazepa escaped with about 1,500 men to Bendery, Moldavia, then controlled by the Ottoman Empire. Charles spent five years in exile there before he was able to return to Sweden in December 1715. During this time, even handicapped, he retained his magisterial calm demeanor under fire, fighting his way out of several situations. The high vizier of the Turks was eventually paid off, with much intrigue and espionage involved and plots within plots, at one point involving a ransom of the Russian crown jewels, according to Charles' prison translator.

Since 3 September 2009, the battlefield has been listed by Ukraine as a monument of national historical significance.

== Sources ==
- Adlerfelt, G. (1740). The Military History of Charles XII, King of Sweden, Written by the Express Order of His Majesty.
- Brown, Peter B. "Gazing Anew at Poltava: Perspectives from the Military Revolution Controversy, Comparative History, and Decision-Making Doctrines." Harvard Ukrainian Studies 31.1/4 (2009): 107–133. online
- Englund, Peter (1988). Poltava: berättelsen om en armés undergång. Atlantis. ISBN 91-7486-834-9.
- Englund, Peter (2003). The Battle that Shook Europe: Poltava and the Birth of the Russian Empire. I.B. Tauris. ISBN 1-86064-847-9.
- Ericson, Lars (2004). Svenska slagfält (in Swedish). Wahlström & Widstrand. ISBN 91-46-21087-3.
- Frost, Robert I. "' Everyone understood what it meant': The Impact of the Battle of Poltava on the Polish-Lithuanian Commonwealth." Harvard Ukrainian Studies 31.1/4 (2009): 159–176 online.
- Gerner, Kristian. "The Battle of Poltava as a Realm of Memory and a Bone of Contention." Harvard Ukrainian Studies 31.1/4 (2009): 679–693 online.
- Hrushevskyi, Mykhailo. Illjustrirovannaja istorija Ukrainy s priloženijami i dopolnenijami.
- Kamenskii, Alexander. "The Battle of Poltava in Russian Historical Memory." Harvard Ukrainian Studies 31.1/4 (2009): 195–204 online.
- Konstam, Angus (1994). Poltava 1709: Russia Comes of Age. Osprey. ISBN 1-85532-416-4.
- LeDonne, John. "Poltava and the geopolitics of Western Eurasia." Harvard Ukrainian Studies 31.1/4 (2009): 177–191 online.
- Massie, Robert K. (1980). Peter the Great: his Life and World. Ballantine Books. ISBN 978-0-345-29806-5..
- Plokhy, Serhii, ed. (2012). Poltava 1709: The Battle and the Myth. Harvard University Press. ISBN 1932650091.
- Velychenko, Stephen. The Battle of Poltava and the Decline of Cossack-Ukraine in light of Russian and English methods of rule in their Borderlands (1707–1914). online
- Voltaire (2013). Voltaire's History of Charles the XII King of Sweden. ISBN 978-1-230-36298-4.
- Von Fabrice, Friedrich. The Genuine Letters of Baron Fabricius Envoy from his Serene Highness the Duke Administrator of Holstein to Charles Xii. of Sweden. ISBN 978-5871371343.
- Egorshina, O.; Petrova, A. (2023). История русской армии [The history of the Russian Army] (in Russian). Moscow: Edition of the Russian Imperial Library. ISBN 978-5-699-42397-2.
- Krotov, Pavel (2014). Полтавская битва: начало великой России [Battle of Poltava: the beginning of great Russia] (in Russian). Лики. ISBN 978-5-903672-13-4.
- Glaeser, Michel (2020). By Defeating my Enemies: Charles XII of Sweden and Great Northern War. Helion & Company. ISBN 978-1-913336-46-2.
