= Boris Sheremetev =

Russian diplomat and military commander (1652–1719)

Count Boris Sheremetev
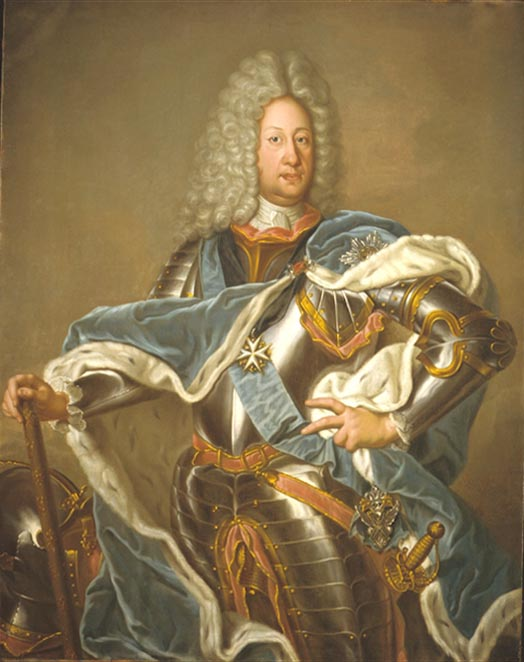
- Portrait by Ivan Argunov
- Born: 5 May 1652; Moscow, Russia
- Died: 28 February 1719 (aged 66); Moscow, Russia
- Military career
- Allegiance: Russia
- Branch: Russian Army (Note: Formally, there was no "Imperial Russian Army" until 1721, but the Army of the Tsardom of Russia had already undergone a massive reorganization by the end of Sheremetev's service, when Peter was transforming his tsardom into an empire.) Army of Peter I
- Service years: 1681–1719
- Rank: Field marshal
- Conflicts: Russo-Polish War: Russo-Turkish War; Crimean campaigns; Azov campaigns; Siege of Kyzykermen; Great Northern War; Battle of Varja; Battle of Narva; Battle of Rauge; Battle of Erastfer; Battle of Hummelshof; Siege of Nöteborg; Battle of Systerbäck; Siege of Dorpat; Battle of Gemauerthof; Battle of Holowczyn; Battle of Poltava; Siege of Riga; Pruth River Campaign
- Awards: Titles: Boyar (1686); Count (1706); Orders: Order of St. Andrew; Order of the White Eagle; Order of the Black Eagle

Count Boris Petrovich Sheremetev (Russian: Бори́с Петро́вич Шереме́тев; 5 May [O.S. 25 April] 1652 – 28 February [O.S. 17 February] 1719) was a Russian diplomat and general field marshal during the Great Northern War. He became the first Russian count in 1706. His children included Pyotr Sheremetev and Natalia Sheremeteva.

== Early life ==
In his youth, Sheremetev was a page to Tsar Alexis I before starting his military career. From 1671 he served at the imperial court. In 1681 he was a leader at Tambov, commanding the armies fighting the Crimean Khanate, and from 1682 he was a boyar. From 1685 to 1687 he participated in negotiations and the conclusion of the "Eternal Peace of 1686" with Poland and the allied treaty with Austria. From the end of 1687 he commanded the armies in Belgorod defending Russia's southern border, and participated in the Crimean campaigns. After Peter I gained power in 1689, he joined him as a fellow campaigner. He participated along with Mazepa in the war against Turkey during the 1690s. During the Azov campaigns in 1695–96 he commanded armies on the Dnieper River in actions against the Crimean Tatars. In 1697–99 he carried out diplomatic assignments in Poland, Austria, Italy and Malta. In 1698, czar Peter sent a delegation to Malta under Sheremetev to observe the training and abilities of the Knights of Malta and their fleet. Sheremetev also investigated the possibility of future joint ventures with the Knights, including action against the Turks and the possibility of a future Russian naval base.

== Great Northern War ==
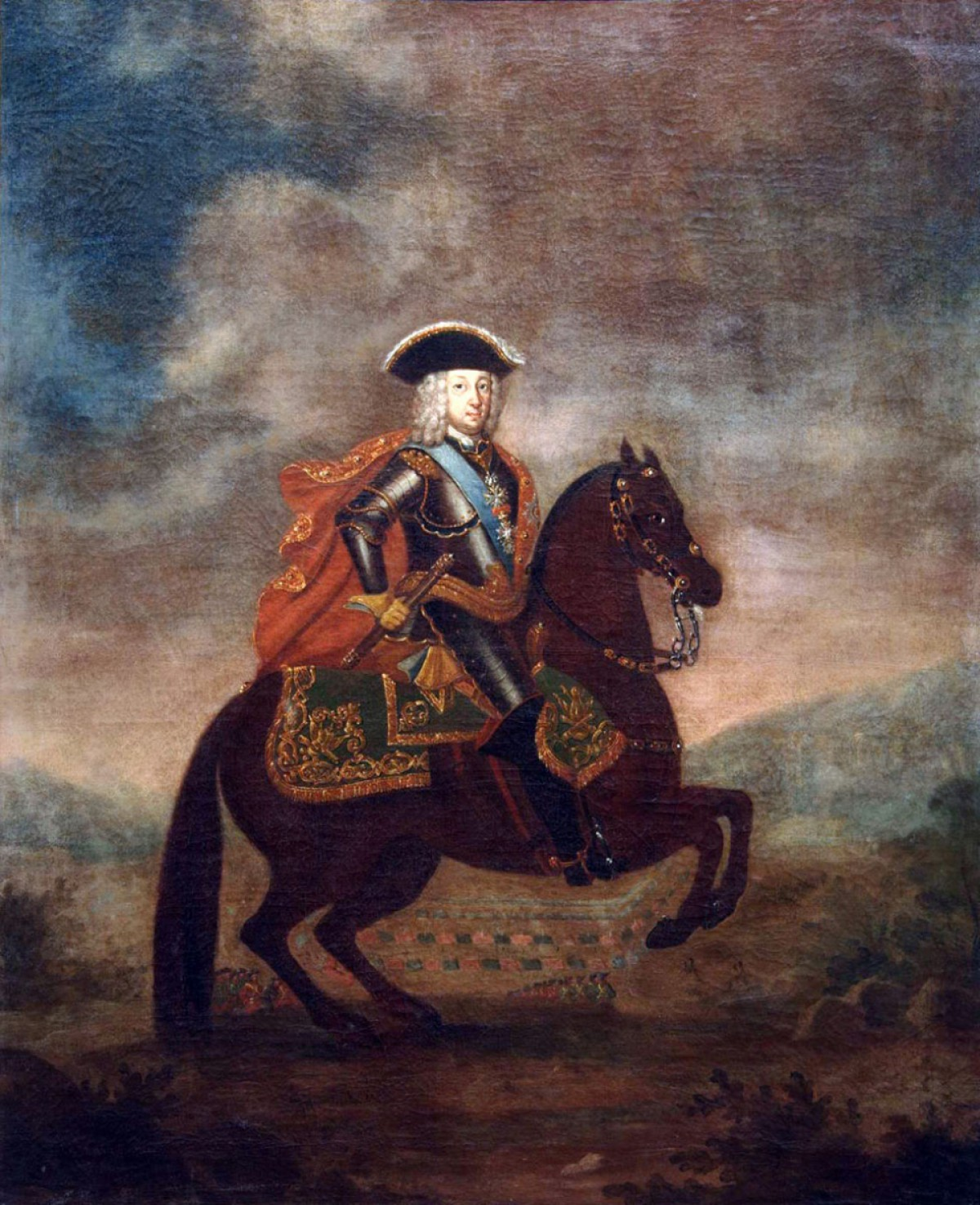
Portrait of Boris Sheremetev on horseback by Ivan Argunov

During the Great Northern War (1700–1721) Sheremetev proved a capable but cautious and sluggish military leader. For much of the war he served as the commander-in-chief and most senior officer in the Russian army. Sheremetev was very cautious in his movements but proved more effective than the younger Prince Menshikov, the second-in-command, whose impulsiveness did not always lead to success.

In 1700 he joined the Russian army in its attack on Narva at the outbreak of the Great Northern War, but King Charles XII of Sweden drove him back from his position in Estonia. He then became commander of the Russian forces fighting the Swedish armies in the Baltic provinces. Colonel W. A. Schlippenbach defeated Sheremetev at Rauge in September 1701, but the Russians turned the tables on Schlippenbach (now a Major-General) at Erastfer in December 1701. This victory won Sheremetev the title of field marshal, and another Russian victory ensued at the Battle of Hummelshof in July 1702. Sheremetev's army's attack on Marienburg (August 1702) led to Martha Skavronskaya coming to the tsar's court, where she eventually became Empress Catherine I (reigned 1725–1727).

Sheremetev took the Swedish Ingrian fortresses of Nöteborg (October 1702) and Nyenskans (1 May 1703) (allowing the foundation of the city of Saint Petersburg later in May 1703)) and the important Baltic cities Dorpat and Narva in 1704. In 1705 Peter I sent him to Astrakhan, where he forcefully and successfully repressed the Astrakhan uprising of 1705–1706.

In the course of the Great Northern War, Sheremetev clashed with the Swedish general Lewenhaupt, who beat him at Gemäuerthof in July 1705, and Charles XII, who defeated him at Holowczyn (July 1708). Sheremetev's revenge came at the Battle of Poltava in 1709, where he functioned as the senior Russian commander of the forces which soundly defeated the Swedish army. Armies under his command conquered Riga in 1710. Sheremetev then led the main forces of the army against the Ottomans in the Prut campaign of 1710–1711. Fighting against the Ottoman Empire in 1711, he suffered encirclement at the Battle of Stănileşti on the Prut (July 1711). In 1715–17 Sheremetev commanded armies in Pomerania and in Mecklenburg.

Although sympathetic to Peter I's policy of Westernising Russia, Sheremetev never became close to the tsar. He died in 1719 in Moscow; Peter I had him buried in the Lazarevskoe Cemetery in St. Petersburg.

== Sources ==
- Hughes, Lindsey (2004). "Catherine I of Russia, Consort to Peter the Great". In Campbell Orr, Clarissa (ed.). Queenship in Europe 1660-1815: The Role of the Consort. Cambridge University Press. pp. 131–154. ISBN 0-521-81422-7.
- Polovtsov, Alexander (1911). Russian Biographical Dictionary. Vol. XXIII: Шебанов—Шютц. St. Petersburg: Типография Главного Управления Уделов. pp. 114–115.
- Novitsky, Vasily F.; Schwartz, Aleksey V. von; Apushkin, Vladimir A.; Schoultz, Gustav K. von (1911). Военная энциклопедия Сытина [Sytin Military Encyclopedia] (in Russian). Vol. III. Аральская флотилия – Афонское сражение. Moscow: Типография Т-ва И. Д. Сытина. p. 194.
