= Wolmar Anton von Schlippenbach =

Governor General of Swedish Estonia

Wolmar Anton von Schlippenbach (23 February 1653 – 27 March 1721) was Governor General of Swedish Estonia from 1704 to 1706.

== Biography ==
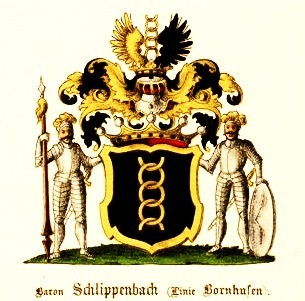
Coat of arms of Bornhausen line of the Schlippenbach family

Born in Livonia into the Baltic line of the German noble Schlippenbach family, he participated as a captain in the Swedish army during the Scanian War under Charles XI and later served as a major in Swedish Pomerania and Prussia. In 1688, he was promoted to lieutenant colonel in governor Soop's regiment in Riga; in 1693, he was transferred to young prince Charles's Life Guards regiment in Stockholm.

When the Great Northern War broke out after the prince was crowned as Charles XII, Schlippenbach raised a regiment of dragoons in Livonia, of which he became the colonel. When Charles broke winter camp at Dorpat (present-day Tartu) and headed towards Riga in early 1701, Schlippenbach was left behind to defend the Livonian border.

He won the battle of Rauge on 5 September 1701 and was subsequently promoted to major general, but was then defeated by a large Russian force under Boris Sheremetev at Erastfer on 30 December the same year and at Sagnitz and Hummelshof on 19 July 1702. In 1703, he had to transfer a good part of his forces to reinforce Lewenhaupt's in Kurland. This left him powerless to prevent Narva and Dorpat from falling into Russian hands in 1704, the same year he was named Governor General in Reval (present-day Tallinn).

When Lewenhaupt marched into Russia in 1708, Schlippenbach followed as colonel of his dragoon regiment. At the battle of Poltava, he led a reconnaissance cavalry squad on the right wing and was captured. He was released from the Russian captivity in 1712, began serving Russia in the rank of general-major in 1712, was promoted to the rank of general-lieutenant in 1714 and died in 1721.

== Sources ==
- Nordisk Familjebok, Owl Edition.

Preceded by Axel Julius De la Gardie	Governor General of Swedish Estonia; 1704–1706	Succeeded by Niels Jonsson Stromberg af Clastorp
