= Swedish calendar =

Calendar in use in Sweden from 1700 to 1712

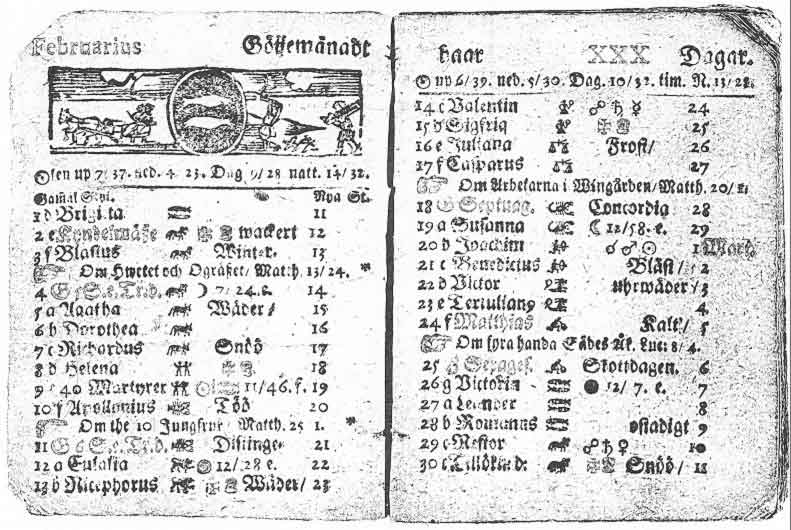
Swedish almanac indicating thirty days in February 1712

The Swedish calendar (Swedish: svenska kalendern) or Swedish Style (svenska stilen) was a calendar in use in Sweden and its eastern Baltic dominions from 1 March 1700 until 30 February 1712. It was one day ahead of the Julian calendar and ten days behind the Gregorian calendar. Sweden reverted to the Julian calendar in 1712 and only adopted the Gregorian calendar in 1753, though initially without its standard Easter rules.

When the calendar was first modified in 1700, the date of Easter continued to be calculated using the traditional Julian method. However, the one-day offset in the ecclesiastical equinox caused Sweden's Easter to differ from the Julian Easter on three occasions between 1700 and 1712. In 1740, Sweden adopted the astronomical Easter of the neighbouring Protestant countries. Although other countries abandoned the astronomical Easter in favor of standard Gregorian Easter rules in 1776, Sweden continued using it until 1844. In Finland, which was separated from Sweden in 1809, the astronomical Easter was observed until 1869.

== Solar calendar ==
In November 1699, the Government of Sweden decided that, rather than adopt the Gregorian calendar outright, it would do so gradually. The leap day was omitted in 1700, but the Great Northern War stopped any further adjustments from being made in the following years.

In January 1711, writing from his camp in Bender (in present-day Moldova), King Charles XII ordered the abandonment of the isolated Swedish calendar and return to the Julian calendar. The king's letter claims that the original intention had been to continually omit successive leap days until alignment with the New Style was reached. To reverse the 1700 omission and realign with the Old Style, the king ordered an extra day to be added to the next leap year. An extra day was added to February in the leap year of 1712, thus giving the month a unique 30-day (30 February) and the year a 367-day length.

The Swedish calendar was used in Sweden, which then included Finland, as well as its dominions in the eastern Baltic, namely Ingria, Estonia and Livonia. However, the Swedish dominions belonging to the Holy Roman Empire, namely Bremen-Verden, Wismar and Western Pomerania, did not adopt the Swedish calendar, but the "improved calendar" in 1700.

Great Britain, its colonies and Ireland introduced the Gregorian calendar in 1752, and Sweden followed suit in 1753. In Sweden, the leap of 11 days was accomplished in one step, with 17 February being followed by 1 March.

== Easter ==
Between 1700 and 1711, the date of Easter was computed by applying the Easter rules of the Julian calendar to the anomalous Swedish calendar. For most years, the resulting date coincided with the standard Julian Easter, diverging from it in 1705, 1709 and 1711. It also differed from the Gregorian Easter in 1701, 1704, 1708 and 1709. As a result, in 1709, Sweden celebrated Easter on a unique date: four weeks after the Gregorian Easter and one week before the Julian Easter.

In 1740, Sweden adopted the "improved calendar" (Verbesserte Calender) already adopted by the Protestant states of Germany in 1700 (which they used until 1775). Its improvement was to calculate the full moon and vernal equinox of Easter according to astronomical tables, specifically Kepler's Rudolphine Tables at the meridian of Tycho Brahe's Uraniborg observatory (destroyed long before) on the island of Ven near the southern tip of Sweden. In addition to the usual medieval rule that Easter was the first Sunday after the first full moon after the vernal equinox, the astronomical Easter Sunday was to be delayed by one week if this calculation would have placed it on the same day as the first day of Jewish Passover week, Nisan 15. It conflicts with the Julian Easter, which could not occur on the 14th day of the moon (Nisan 14), but was permitted on Nisan 15 to 21 although those dates were calculated via Christian, not Jewish, tables (see Computus). The resulting astronomical Easter dates in the Julian calendar used in Sweden from 1740 to 1752 occurred on the same Sunday as the Julian Easter every three years but were earlier than the earliest canonical limit for Easter of 22 March in 1742, 1744 and 1750.

After the adoption of the Gregorian solar calendar in 1753, three astronomical Easter dates were one week later than the Gregorian Easter in 1802, 1805 and 1818. Before Sweden formally adopted the Gregorian Easter in 1844, two more should have been delayed in 1825 and 1829 but were not.

Meanwhile, Finland had been separated from Sweden in 1809 as a result of the Finnish War, becoming the autonomous Grand Duchy of Finland within the Russian Empire. Consequently, new Swedish laws and reforms no longer applied there. Until 1866, Finland continued to observe astronomical Easter, which occurred one week after the Gregorian Easter in 1818, 1825, 1829 and 1845. In 1825 and 1829, the date of astronomical Easter coincided with Julian Easter. In 1845, Finland was the only country to celebrate Easter on 30 March. This would have occurred again in 1869, but Finland adopted the Gregorian reckoning at the start of that year.

== See also ==
- Leap year
- Holidays in Sweden
- Flag flying days in Sweden
- Name days in Sweden
- Adoption of the Gregorian calendar
