= Slavery in Finland =

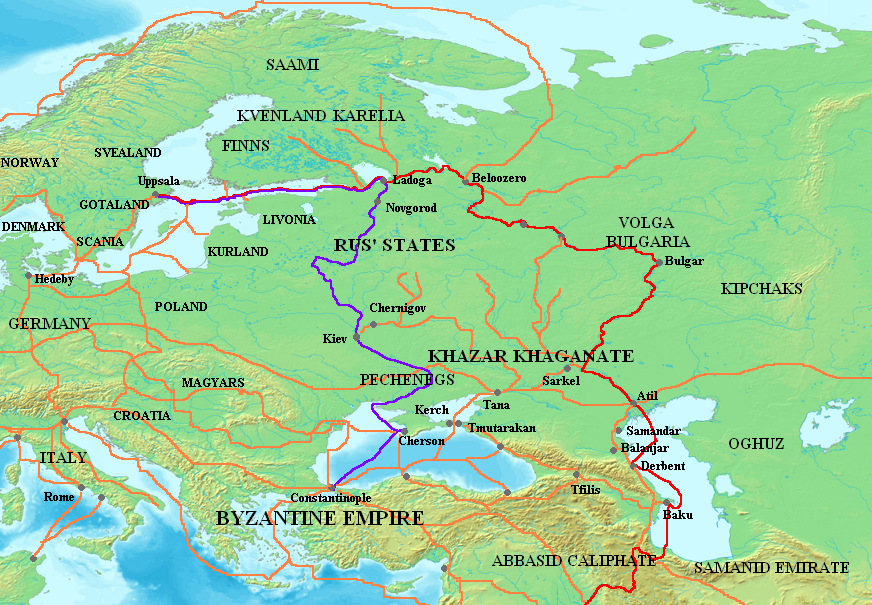
Routes through Slavic territories used for the slave trade: the Volga trade route from the Vikings (Varangians) to the Muslim Middle East (red); route from the Varangians to the Greeks (Byzantines) (blue), and other 8th–11th century trade routes (orange)

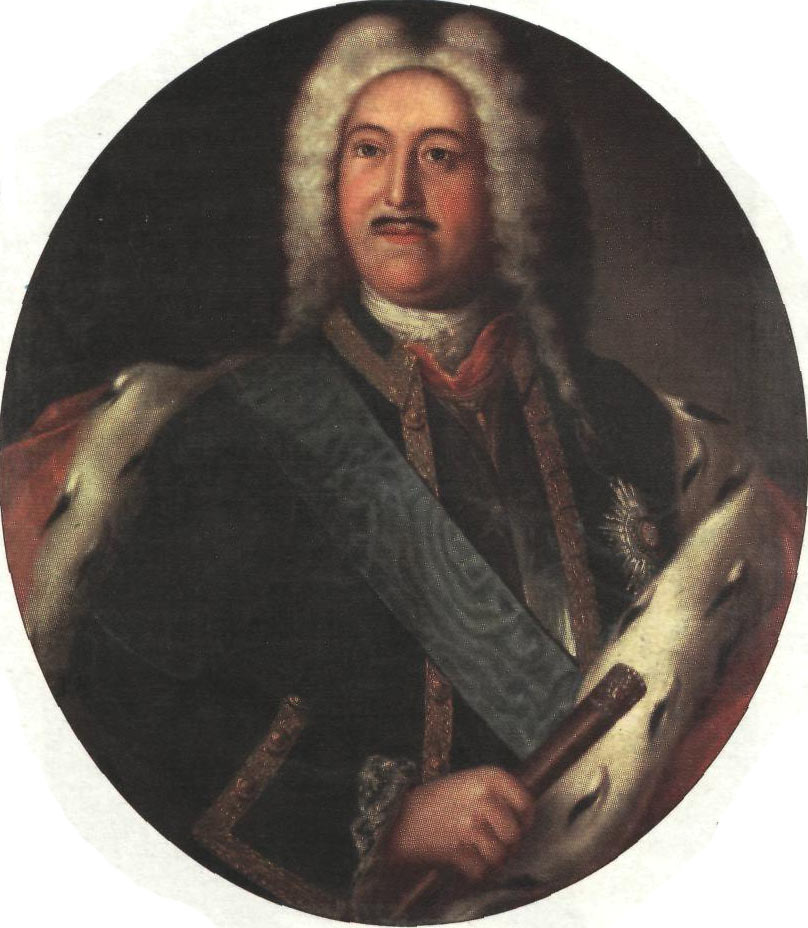
Mikhail Golitsyn, Russian governor of Finland during the Great Wrath slave trade

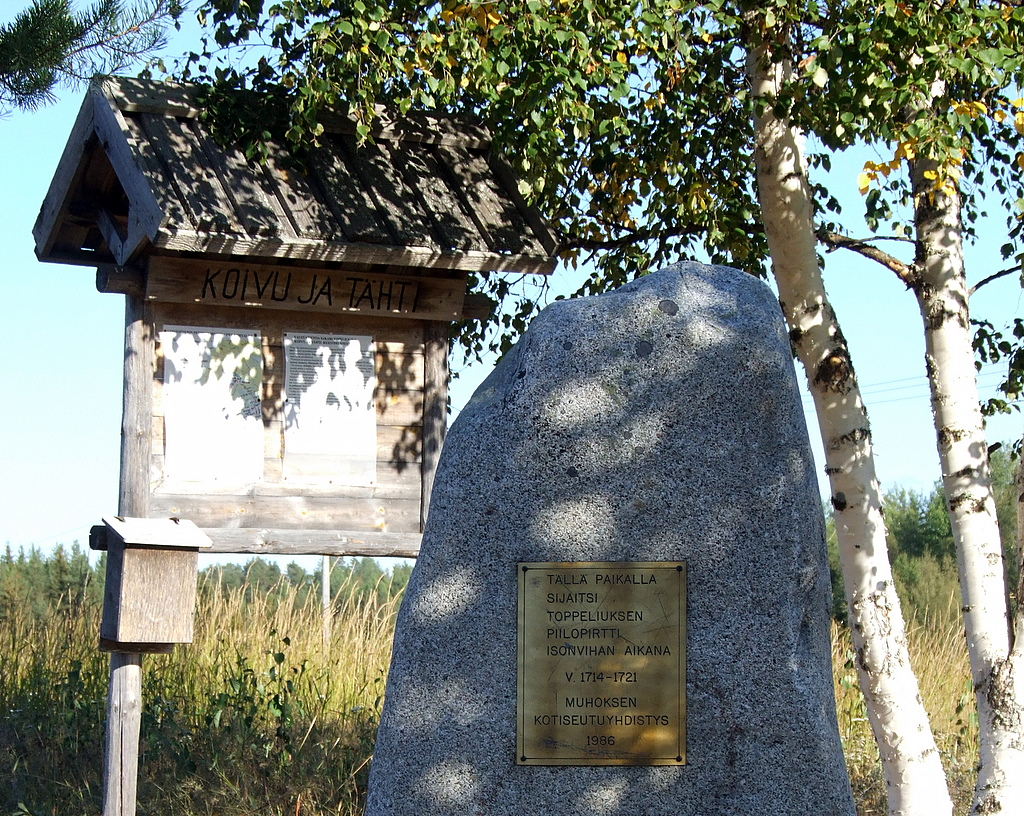
Memorial stone for the victims of the Great Wrath slave trade in Muhos, Finland

Although chattel slavery probably existed in Finland during the Viking Age (as it did in most cultures around the world), historical evidence of slavery in Finland is scarce. The practice legally ended in 1335 when King Magnus Eriksson banned slavery in Sweden, including Finland (which had been part of the Swedish realm since the Middle Ages).

A religious and political border zone, Finland was a source of slaves. It was initially one of the few remaining pagan areas in Europe, located between Christian Sweden and Russia. After its Christianization, Finland was a frontier between Roman Catholic (and later Protestant) Europe on the west and Russian Orthodoxy on the east. It became a borderland between Sweden and Russia, often a battleground during their frequent conflicts.

Finland's position made it vulnerable to slave raids. In the raids, typically from Russia, Finnish captives were enslaved locally or trafficked further south to the Black Sea region, Central Asia and the Middle East. This trade continued until the 18th century, peaking during the Russian occupation of Finland in the Great Northern War known as the Great Wrath.

As Swedish citizens, Finns played a role in the Swedish slave trade and Swedish colonialism. Slavery-related money entered the Finnish economy, and slave-produced goods were imported to Finland. According to some historians, the focus on Finnish enslavement has been politicized to direct attention away from Finnish involvement in the Atlantic slave trade.

== Slavery ==
Slavery probably existed in Finland as it did in most societies during antiquity, when slavery was considered normal in many cultures. There is little documentation of Finnish society before it became part of Sweden in the 12th and 13th centuries, however, and there are no direct mentions of slavery in Finland. Interpretations of Finnish epic folklore suggest that the Finnish elite owned slaves during the Viking Age (800–1050).

Between 1150 and 1250, Finland gradually became part of Sweden and was Christianized. The Swedish period marks the beginning of Finland's documented history, and there is no mention of slavery in Finland at this time. During the Middle Ages, slavery was phased out in Europe due to the Christian doctrine that Christians should not enslave other Christians. As Europe became increasingly Christian, pagan slaves could no longer be acquired.

Finland, under Swedish rule, was influenced by Swedish policy. Slavery was gradually phased out in Sweden during the 13th century, and was banned in 1335 by King Magnus Eriksson. Although slavery may have existed in Finland before that date, the law made it impossible for it to continue after 1335.

== Slave trade ==
Finland did not conduct any known slave trade. It was subjected to slave raids for centuries, however, primarily from the east (present-day Russia). As a vulnerable border region between Sweden and Russia, Finland was often a battleground during their frequent wars.

In a religious border zone—first between the Christian and pagan worlds, and later between Catholic and Protestant Europe and the Orthodox East—the Finnish people were often viewed as religiously-legitimate targets of enslavement. Their typically blonde features were considered exotic and desirable in southern slave markets, and Finnish people were trafficked for enslavement in Russia or further south along river routes to the Black Sea slave markets, Central Asia and the Middle East.

=== Byzantine slave trade (5th–13th centuries) ===
The Baltic Sea coast was a source of slaves for the Black Sea slave trade during the Middle Ages, who were transported down river routes heading southeast. The region was also a center of the Viking slave trade and, later, the Baltic slave trade.

Christians and Muslims banned the enslavement of people of their own faith, but viewed pagans as targets for slavery; the pagans of northeastern Europe became prime targets for slave traders after the rest of Europe became Christian by the 12th century. The pagan Lithuanians, Latvians, Estonians, Livonians, and Latgallians raided each other, in addition to Ingria and Novgorod, during the 12th and 13th centuries and sold war captives south to the Black Sea slave trade. Christian Rus' merchants from Kievan Rus' raided pagan Estonians to capture and sell them as slaves, since they were considered legitimate targets due to their paganism.

When the Norse Vikings converted to Christianity and ended their piracy during the 11th century, they were succeeded by pagan pirates from the Baltic who raided the Baltic Sea coast—including the newly-Christianized Sweden and Finland—to capture slaves. The island of Saaremaa was a base for Baltic pirates, who were known for selling captive women in the slave trade. Baltic pirates from Saaremaa raided the newly-Christianized Sweden in 1226, capturing Swedish women and girls to sell them as slaves.

When the Viking slave trade ended in the mid-11th century, the old slave-trade route between the Baltic Sea and the Black Sea and Central Asia via Russian rivers was maintained by pagan Baltic traders who sold slaves through the Daugava River to the Black Sea. This was Europe's only remaining slave-trade route after the Western European slave markets declined in the 12th century.

=== Italian slave trade (13th–15th centuries) ===
During this period, religious conviction played an important role in determining who could be enslaved; Christians could not enslave other Christians, and Muslims could not enslave other Muslims. Since Christians and Muslims regarded pagans as legitimate targets for slavery, the remaining pagans of northeastern Europe became an economic choice for slave traders.

By the 13th century, Europe had become Christian except for the Baltics, Eastern Finland and Karelia. These regions were supply zones via the Baltic and Kievan Rus' for slaves destined for the Black Sea slave trade. From there, Italian slave traders trafficked them to Southern Europe and the Middle East. The Black Sea was the center of the Genoese and Venetian slave trade, which exported slaves from Eastern Europe via their controlled cities in Crimea to Spain, Italy, and the Middle East during the late Middle Ages (13th to 15th centuries).

=== Crimean slave trade and Russia (16th–18th centuries) ===
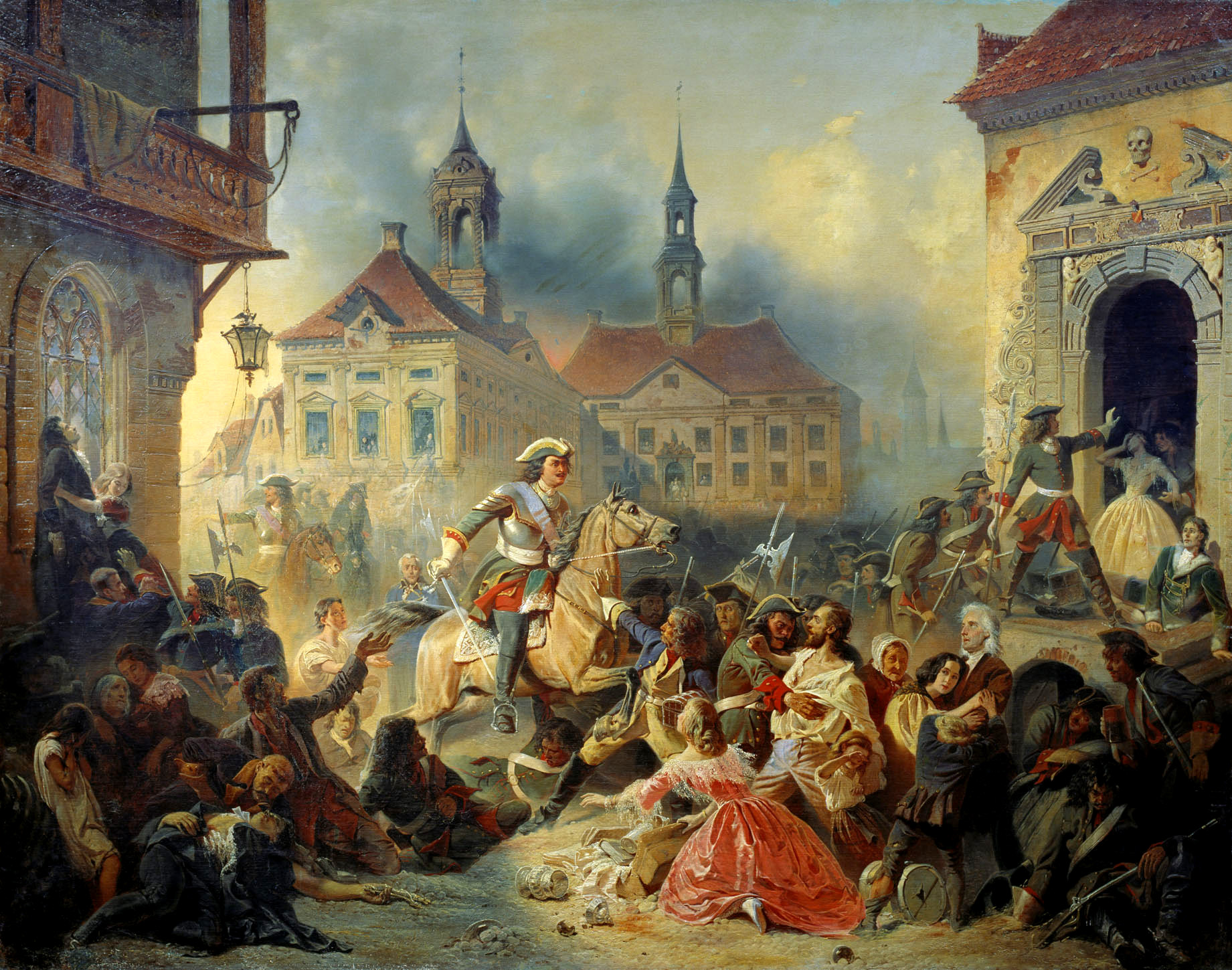
Peter I pacifies his marauding troops after taking Narva in 1704 by Nikolay Sauerweid (1859). Many Swedish Empire citizens were captured by Russian soldiers at this time and sold to Crimea.

Slave raids by Russian traders across the border into Eastern Finland, capturing Finns and trafficking them south to the Black Sea, began during the Middle Ages and are estimated to have continued throughout the 17th century. During the Great Northern War (1700–1721), Russia invaded the eastern provinces of the Swedish Empire in Finland, Estonia and Livonia. Since the 15th century, the Russian army had permitted soldiers to capture and sell war captives. During the war, many Russian soldiers captured Livonians, Finns, and Baltic civilians (particularly children from the Swedish provinces), and sold them; some ending up in the Black Sea slave trade and in Persia.

Lovisa von Burghausen was a victim of the fall of Narva, captured by Russian soldiers who sold her into slavery. Annika Svahn and Afrosinya, two other women, were sold on Moscow's slave market. One was sold to an Armenian, one to a Russian clerk, and Lovisa to a Turkish-Ottoman merchant.

The Swedish province of Finland was oppressed during the Russian invasion and occupation known as the Great Wrath (1714–1721). The Russian military abducted and enslaved people, some of whom were trafficked through Russia and the Crimean slave trade to Persia and the Middle East, where blonde people were considered exotic. It is estimated that between 20,000 and 30,000 people were abducted, and about one-fourth of Finnish farmhouses were reportedly empty by the end of the occupation. Finnish historian Teemu Keskisarja has suggested that during the Great Northern War, more slaves were taken from Finland to Russia (relative to population) than from many regions of Africa to the Americas.

Between 10,000 and 20,000 people were taken to work as slave labourers during the building of Saint Petersburg. Approximately 2,000 men were forcibly enlisted in the Russian army; many women and children were also abducted as serfs or sex slaves by Russian officers, some of whom sold them into the Crimean slave trade. About 4,600 people, most of them children, were abducted from Ostrobothnia and Eastern Finland. Kustaa Lillbäck was another Finn abducted by the Russians during the Great Wrath.

Many Swedish Empire citizens captured and sold by Russian soldiers were trafficked through the Crimean slave trade to the slave market in Constantinople, where the Swedish ambassador secured the freedom of some; many were women. In June 1710, Swedish ambassador Thomas Funck began buying Swedish Empire citizens at Constantinople's slave market. According to his legation priest, Sven Agrell, a "carpenter's daughter from Narva" was purchased for $82; a "Captain's wife" for $240; Catharina Pereswetoff-Morath (age 18) for $275, and a Livonian family (Anders Jonsson, his wife and children) was also purchased.

Those who were bought with Swedish funds were escorted to King Charles XII's war camp in Bender, and returned to Sweden with him. Although many Swedish Empire citizens were freed by the Swedish ambassador, limited wartime finances made it impossible to buy all the Swedish citizens who were enslaved. Many young women and children were too expensive, and many were purchased privately and remained in the Ottoman Empire.

=== Atlantic slave trade ===
People of Finnish origin were involved in Swedish colonies in West Africa, North America (New Sweden) and the Caribbean which were implicated in the Atlantic slave trade. Slave labor was used in the Swedish colony of Saint Barthélemy. The first Governor of St. Barthélemy, Salomon von Rajalin, was a Swede of Finnish origin who promoted the development of St. Barthélemy as a hub of the Atlantic slave trade. Historian Seppo Sivonen and documentary filmmaker Jouko Aaltonen have said that Finland, as the eastern province of the Sweden, benefited from the global slave trade through the profit of individual Finnish investors and from profits flowing into the Swedish state treasury.

== Legacy ==
Orjaleiripatsas, a memorial designed by Antero Kassinen, was inaugurated in memory of Finnish victims of the slave trade during the Great Wrath on 3 September 2022 in Muhos, Finland. Some scholars have said that the enslavement of Finns was rarely discussed in Finnish historiography until the role of Finns in the African slave trade became better-known. History professor Holger Weiss said that the debate about Finnish involvement in the African slave trade has been "challenged by an equally forgotten narrative" about the enslavement of Finns and Karelians; the issue "hardly figured in Finnish historiography until Finnish historian Jukka Korpela published his seminal work on Finland and Karelia as a slaving zone during the medieval period in 2014 ... The collective memory of Finns must commemorate the sufferings of Finns during Russian occupation rather than alleged Finnish participation in Swedish colonialism, the counter-narrative to Finnish involvement in the transatlantic slave trade therefore claims."

== See also ==
- Viipuri Province § Serfdom — Russian-type serfdom in Old Finland
- Child auction — Placement of orphan and poor children with the lowest bidder
- Human trafficking in Finland

== Works cited ==
- Korpela, Jukka (2018). Slaves from the North: Finns and Karelians in the East European Slave Trade, 900–1600. Studies in Global Slavery. Vol. 5. Leiden: Brill. ISBN 978-90-04-38173-5.
