= Sauerweid =

Sauerweid is a surname. Notable people with the surname include:

- Alexander Sauerweid (1783–1844), Baltic German painter
- Nikolay Sauerweid (1836–1866), Russian painter
