= Sverchkov =

Sverchkov (Russian: Сверчко́в) is a Russian masculine surname derived from the noun svcerchok meaning cricket (insect); its feminine counterpart is Sverchkova. It may refer to the following notable people:

- Nikolai Sverchkov (1817–1898), Russian painter
- Sergey Kud-Sverchkov (born 1983), Russian cosmonaut
