= Georg Benedikt von Ogilvy =

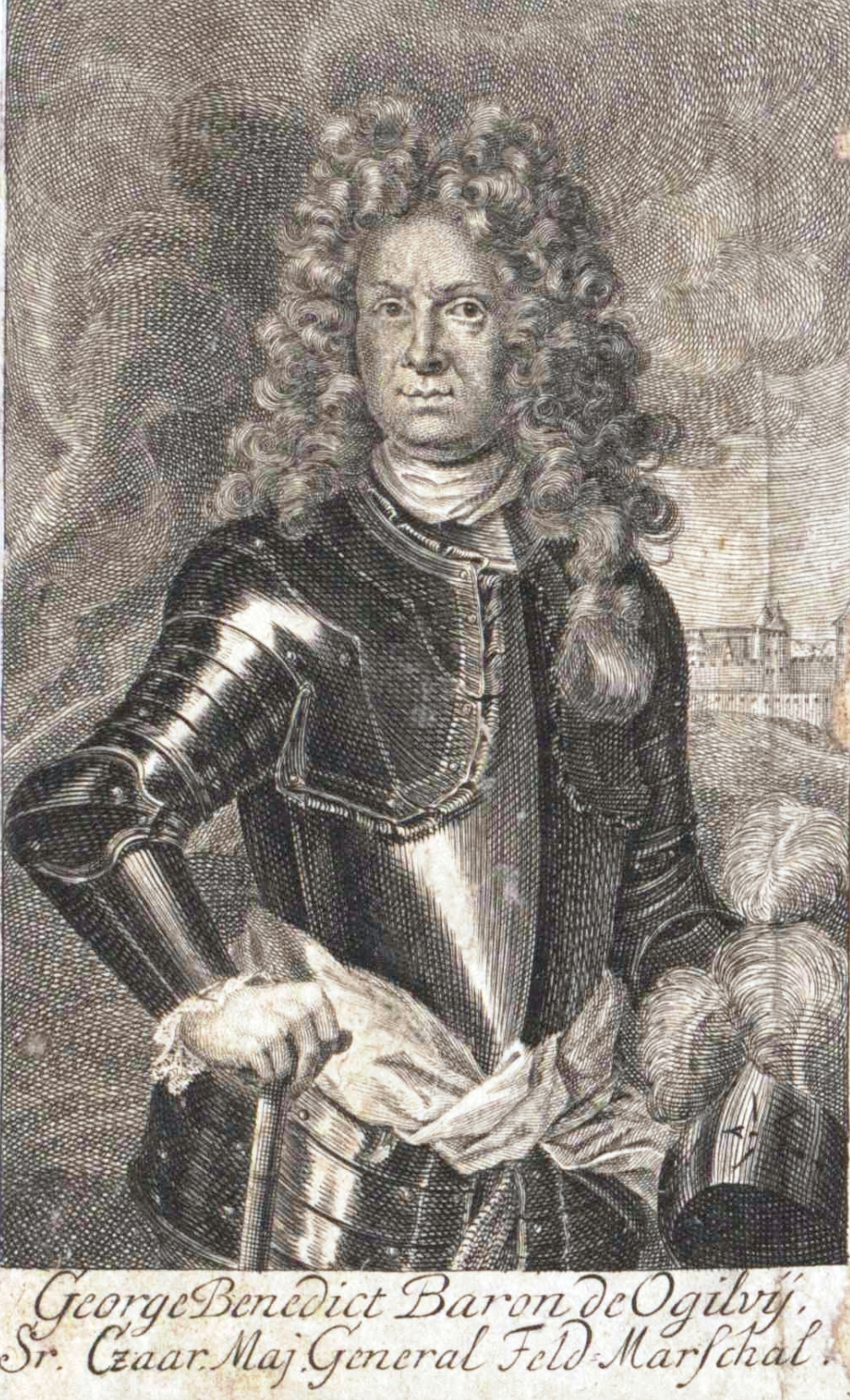
Georg Benedikt Ogilvy, engraving by Martin Bernigeroth

Georg Benedikt Freiherr von Ogilvy, Baron Ogilvy de Muirtown (19 March 1651 – 8 October 1710), was a Polish-Saxon Field Marshal of Scottish descent, who also served in the Habsburg and Russian armies.

== Biography ==
Ogilvy was born on 19 March 1651 in Želešice, Moravia. He was the son of Baron George Jacob von Ogilvy (1605–1661), commander of the Špilberk Castle in Brno from the 1645 Siege until his death. Georg Jacob was born in Perthshire, Scotland as the son of Francis Ogilvy of Smiddyhill, and grandson of James Ogilvy, 5th Lord Ogilvy of Airlie from the Scottish Clan Ogilvy. He left Scotland in 1627 to fight for the King of Denmark in the Thirty Years' War, but joined the Imperial Habsburg army two years later.

=== In Imperial Habsburg service ===
Georg Benedikt joined the regiment of the Imperial general Walter Leslie in 1664 as a thirteen-year-old pikeman, then became a corporal, sergeant, ensign and lieutenant, until he finally received his own company. In 1677 he became a Colonel-sergeant in Prince Ludwig von Baden's regiment. After serving for some time as a trench major at the Siege of Buda (1684), he was appointed Colonel-lieutenant and commandant of the Belgrade Fortress in 1689.

In 1691, Emperor Leopold I gave him his own regiment as a Colonel and the following year he was given the rank of Real Imperial Chamberlain. In 1696, by then General-Feld-Wachtmeister, he became Commandant of Tokaj. In 1702, he was ordered to the Imperial Army on the Rhine, where he took part in the Siege of Landau (1702) under the general command of Emperor Joseph I. The following year 1703, he was appointed Lieutenant General-Feld-Marshal.

=== General in Russian service ===
During his visit to Vienna in 1698, Tsar Peter the Great had noticed Ogilvy and in 1702 he sent Johann Patkul to invite him to Russia. With the Emperor's permission, Ogilvy accepted this invitation and became Imperial Russian Field Marshal General and commanding general of all Russian troops, succeeding the late General François Le Fort. In this capacity, he was deployed in the Great Northern War. In 1704, he commanded the Siege of Narva and was able to capture the city on 9 August. On the 16th of the same month, he captured the Ivangorod Fortress from Sweden.

In 1706, Ogilvy suffered a defeat in the Battle of Grodno and was consequently replaced by Boris Sheremetev as Supreme commander. But Ogilvy categorically refused to serve under Sheremetev and in September 1706 he resigned from Russian service.

=== Polish-Saxon General Field Marshal ===
After completing his service in Russia, the Polish King and Saxon Elector Augustus II the Strong, appointed him General Field Marshal, Real Privy Councillor and President of the Secret War Council College. He also awarded him a regiment of infantry and one of cavalry and a number of other privileges. At the same time, he was given a position as Imperial General Field Master of the Army.

In 1708, he acquired the lordships of Zahořany and Tašov in Bohemia, both near Litoměřice. After he had marched into Poland with the Electoral Saxon army to besiege Danzig, he died there on 8 October 1710.

=== Family ===
He was married to Maria Anastasia von Zuckmantel zu Brumath (died 4 June 1695).
The couple's only son, Hermann Carl von Ogilvy, became their sole heir and an Imperial Generalfeldmarschall.
