= Brigitta Scherzenfeldt =

Swedish artist (1684–1736)

- Born: Brigitta Christina Scherzenfeldt; 1684; Bäckaskog, Sweden
- Died: 1736 (aged c. 52); Stockholm, Sweden
- Other names: Brigitta Christina Bernow; Brigitta Christina Lindström; Brigitta Christina Ziems; Brigitta Christina Renat ?
- Occupations: Memoirist, weaving teacher
- Known for: Living as a slave amongst the Dzungars
- Spouse(s): Mats Bernow; Johan Lindström; Michael Ziems; Johan Gustaf Renat ?

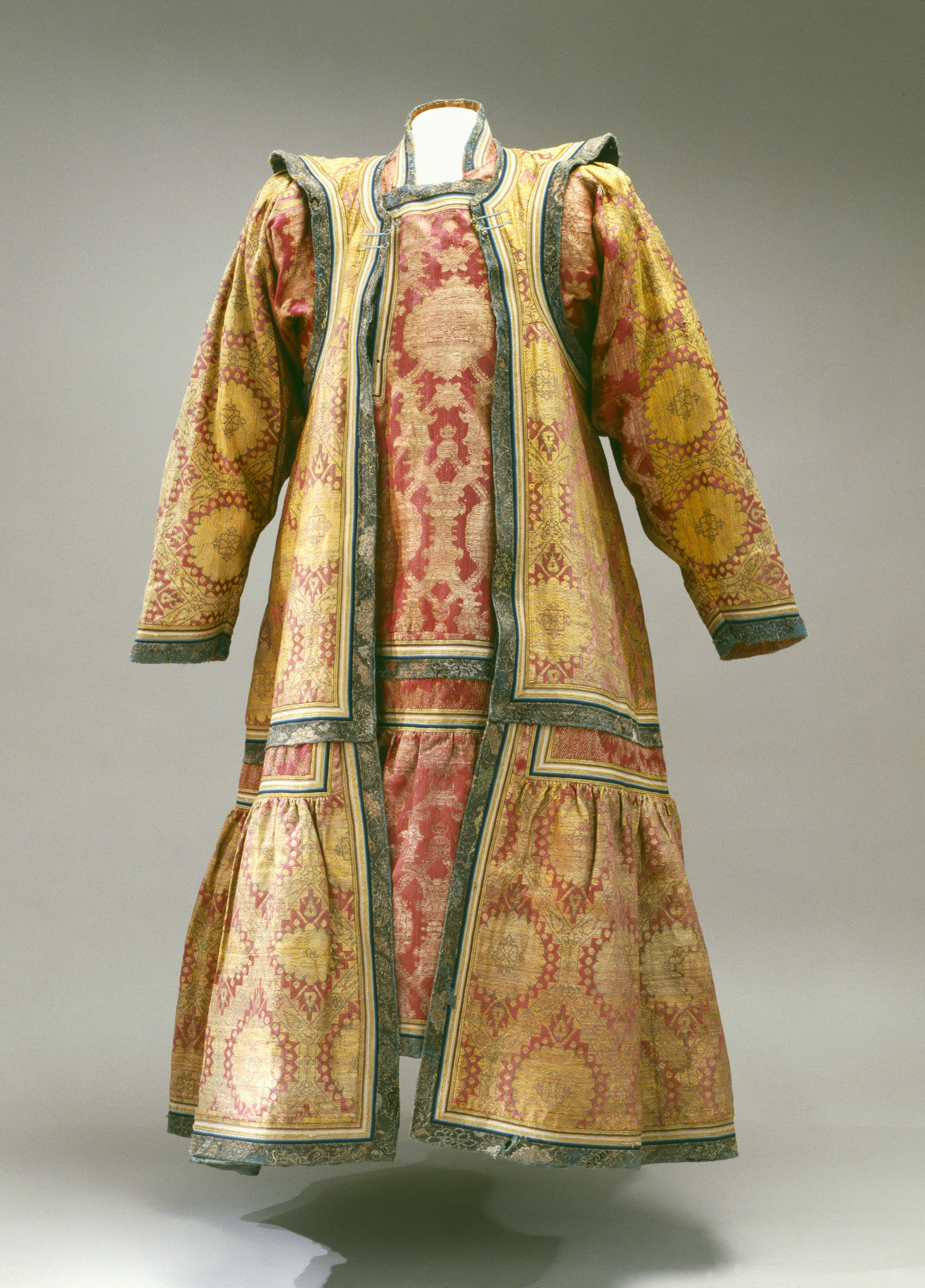
The Dzungar costume of Brigitta Scherzenfeldt in Livrustkammaren

Brigitta Christina Scherzenfeldt, as married Bernow, Lindström, Ziems, and Renat (1684 – 4 April 1736), was a Swedish memoirist and weaving teacher who was captured during the Great Northern War and lived as a slave over 15 years in the Dzungar Khanate in Central Asia. She dictated her memoirs, describing her life as a slave, after her release. Her story is regarded as a unique source of information about life among the Dzungars.

== Early life ==
Born in Bäckaskog Manor in Scania in Sweden as the child of the noble Lieutenant Knut Scherzenfeldt and Brigitta Tranander. She married the military officer Mats Bernow at the Life Guards in 1699 and followed him to war in 1700. She mainly lived in Riga, and when her spouse died in Thorn in 1703, she married the military officer Johan Lindström.

After the Battle of Narva, they were both taken to Moscow as prisoners, where she became a widow in 1711. She remarried again in 1712, this time to a lieutenant, Michael Ziems, a German who had been taken prisoner of war in by the Russians during his service in the Swedish army; they were subsequently both deported to Tobolsk in Siberia.

Ziems, who was a German mercenary and not a Swedish subject, joined the service of the Russian army in 1715 to gain their freedom. In 1716, Ziems was a part of the reinforcements sent to the garrison of Ivan Bucholtz at Jarmyn Lake, above the Irtysh River, by Governor Matvei Petrovich Gagarin. Scherzenfeldt, as well as several other Swedish and German people in Russian service, was a part of that convoy. At the same time, the garrison was attacked and captured by the Dzungar, who also met and defeated the convoy, killing Michael Ziems in the process.

== Slavery ==
Scherzenfeldt was captured, abused with iron and ropes, stripped, and almost raped, but she defended herself so forcefully that she tore a piece of flesh from the leg of her attacker. The attacker then wished to kill her, but was stopped by a comrade, and she was then taken naked to the Khanate in Ili with the other survivors and presented to the Khan, Tsewang Rabtan, himself.

The khan curiously asked her why she had resisted the rape attempt so forcefully, and when she told him about the customs of her country, he ordered that she should never be sexually attacked in the future. The Khan then gave her as a gift to one of his wives, a princess from Tibet, who gave Scherzenfeldt clothes to wear. The story about the rape attempt is not in her official story, but was confided by her to an English woman, Mrs. Vigor, several years later in Moscow.

Scherzenfeldt was made a teacher in weaving and knitting, and soon became appreciated for her knowledge in these crafts and her good manners; she was appointed knitting instructor to the Khan's favorite daughter, Princess Seson, and was soon regarded as more of a lady-in-waiting than a slave. During two years, she was the official representative for the purchases from the Princess' dowry in Yarkent County in Xinjiang in China, where she would have been the first Swedish person until the 1890s.

She was also active in making a better life for other slaves belonging to the Dzungars. Among them was a Swedish man named Johan Gustaf Renat (born 1682 in Stockholm), the son of Dutch Jewish immigrants who converted to Christianity as part of becoming Swedish subjects in 1681. Renat had been captured at Poltava during his service in the Swedish army. Subsequently enlisting in the Russian army to escape captivity in Siberia, he was captured by the Dzungars, to whom he became an instructor in the cannon-forging and book printing. He led an attack during a battle against the Qing Empire and also made some of the weaving looms for Scherzenfeldt's workshops.

Princess Seson wanted Scherzenfeldt to come with her when she was to marry the Khan of the Volga Kalmyks, but she refused, as she feared she would never again see Sweden if she did so. Instead, she feigned a marriage to Renat (the marriage never actually took place) and left the court of the princess.

Shortly after this, in 1727, the khan Tsewang Rabtan died. The Princess, her mother, and every one belonging to her court were accused of having poisoned him to place Seson's brother on the throne; they confessed, were tortured, and executed.

Scherzenfeldt was the target of many suspicions and intrigues but survived due to her good sense and great care. She managed to convince the new Khan to agree on her demand that the eighteen Swedish and one hundred and thirty-four Russian slaves be released. Later, she helped another Mongol khan in planning his campaigns against the Qing.

== The release ==
In 1733, Scherzenfeldt and Renat left Central Asia in the company of a Russian ambassador and twenty Kalmyk or Dzungar slaves, which were given to them upon their departure; six of them were subsequently kept by the Russians, but several others died before arriving in Moscow.

They had been allowed to leave only to visit their home country and were expected to return. In Moscow, she told an English woman, Mrs Vigor, some about her experiences, which were published by Vigor in a book about Russia.

When the survivors entered Stockholm in 1734, the three remaining Kalmyks (Altan, Iamakiss and Zara) were baptized in the Lutheran Protestant Church to become Anna Catharina, Maria Stina and Sara Greta; they then became maids in the Renat household. She wrote her own memoirs of her experiences.

Scherzenfeldt died in Stockholm in 1736. Her Dzungar costume of red silk is now on display in the Livrustkammaren in Stockholm.

== Media ==
- Her book is not available in English.
- She appears in a Russian film called The Conquest of Siberia, but it completely changes her story.

== See also ==
- Lovisa von Burghausen
- Brita Olsdotter
- Ulrika Eleonora Stålhammar
- Yefrosinya Fedorov
- List of enslaved people
