= Nikolai Sverchkov =

Russian painter

- Николай Егорович Сверчков
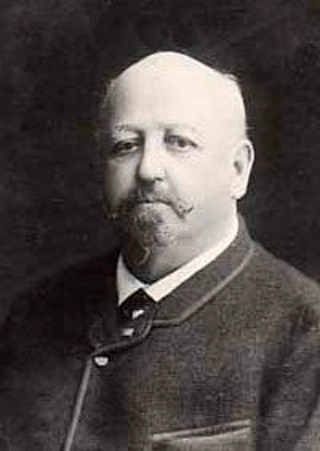
- Nikolai Sverchkov (1880s)
- Born: February 2, 1817; Saint Petersburg
- Died: July 25, 1898 (aged 81); Tsarskoye Selo
- Education: Member Academy of Arts (1852); Professor by rank (1855)
- Known for: Painting

Nikolai Yegorovich Sverchkov (Russian: Николай Егорович Сверчков; 1817–1898) was a Russian painter who specialized in genre and hunting scenes with horses. He was also a member of the Imperial Academy of Arts.

== Biography ==
His father was an Imperial groom and coachman. As a child, he worked with his father and began drawing animals. Impressed with his work, his parents arranged for him to take lessons at the Imperial Academy of Arts with the battle painter, Alexander Sauerweid, from 1827 to 1829. Unable to keep up with the rigorous program there, he was transferred to the prestigious Saint Peter's School, where he studied from 1829 to 1833. Upon graduating, he found employment with the Ministry of the Interior.

He painted in his free time and showed his works at the annual exhibitions of the Academy. In 1839, he was awarded the title of "Free Artist" and quit the civil service. During the 1840s, he visited several famous stud farms to paint scenes of the horses there. In 1850, these were published in book form by the Velten company in Karlsruhe.

Following that, he visited Nikolai Nekrasov at his estate near Yaroslavl and created illustrations for some of his works. In 1852, he was named an "Academician" for his popular troika paintings, and became a Professor in 1855.

From 1856 to 1864, he lived abroad; first in Paris, where he exhibited at the Salon, then in London and Brussels. In 1863, his painting of a bear hunt was purchased by Emperor Napoleon III.

Upon returning to Saint Petersburg in 1864, he was commissioned by Tsar Alexander II to paint a large canvas depicting the departure of Tsar Alexis I to inspect his troops in 1664. He would continue to receive orders from the Royal Court until 1882. Most of this work involved equestrian portraits of members of the Royal Family, but he also did battle scenes; especially from the Russo-Turkish War.

He continued to exhibit frequently, participating in many international shows, including the Centennial Exposition in Philadelphia. In all, he produced 350 paintings and over a thousand drawings.

== Works ==
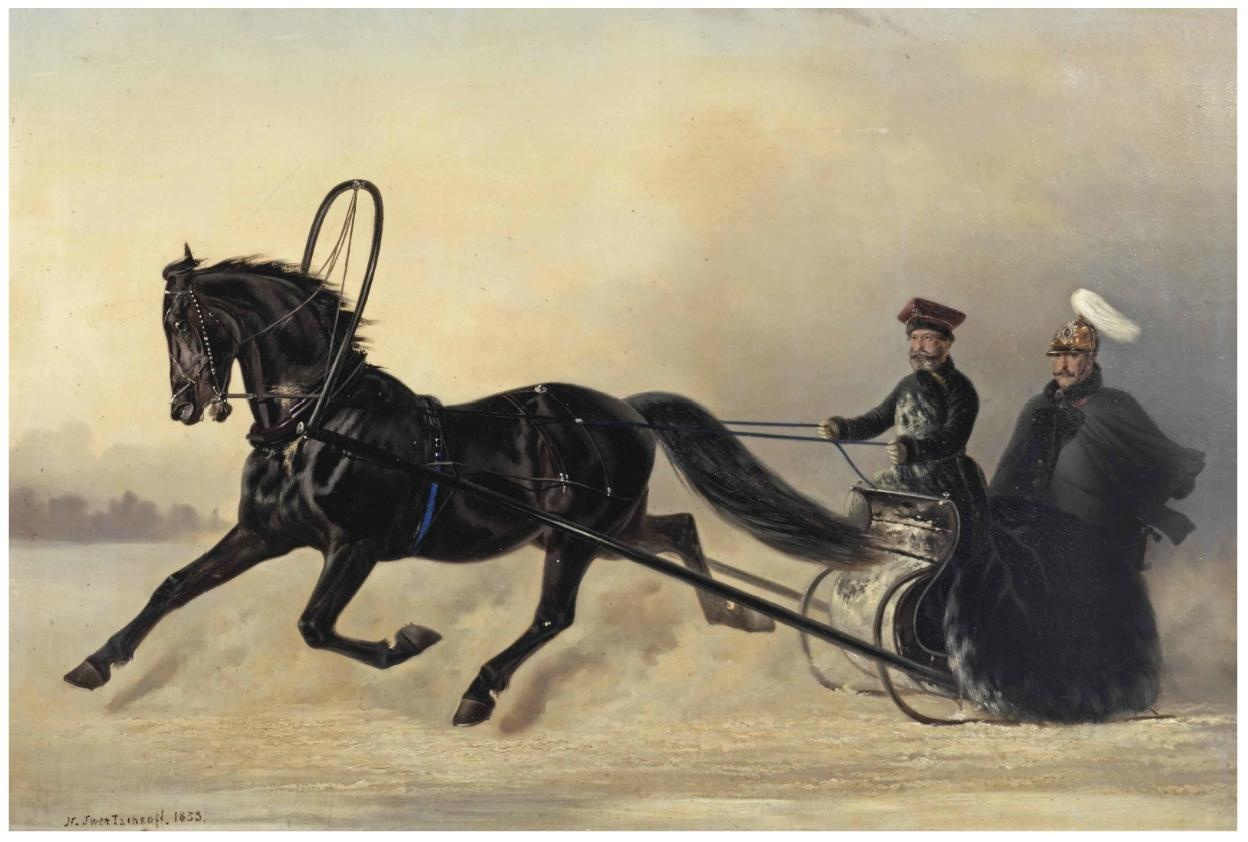
Emperor Nicholas I at the winter departure (1851)

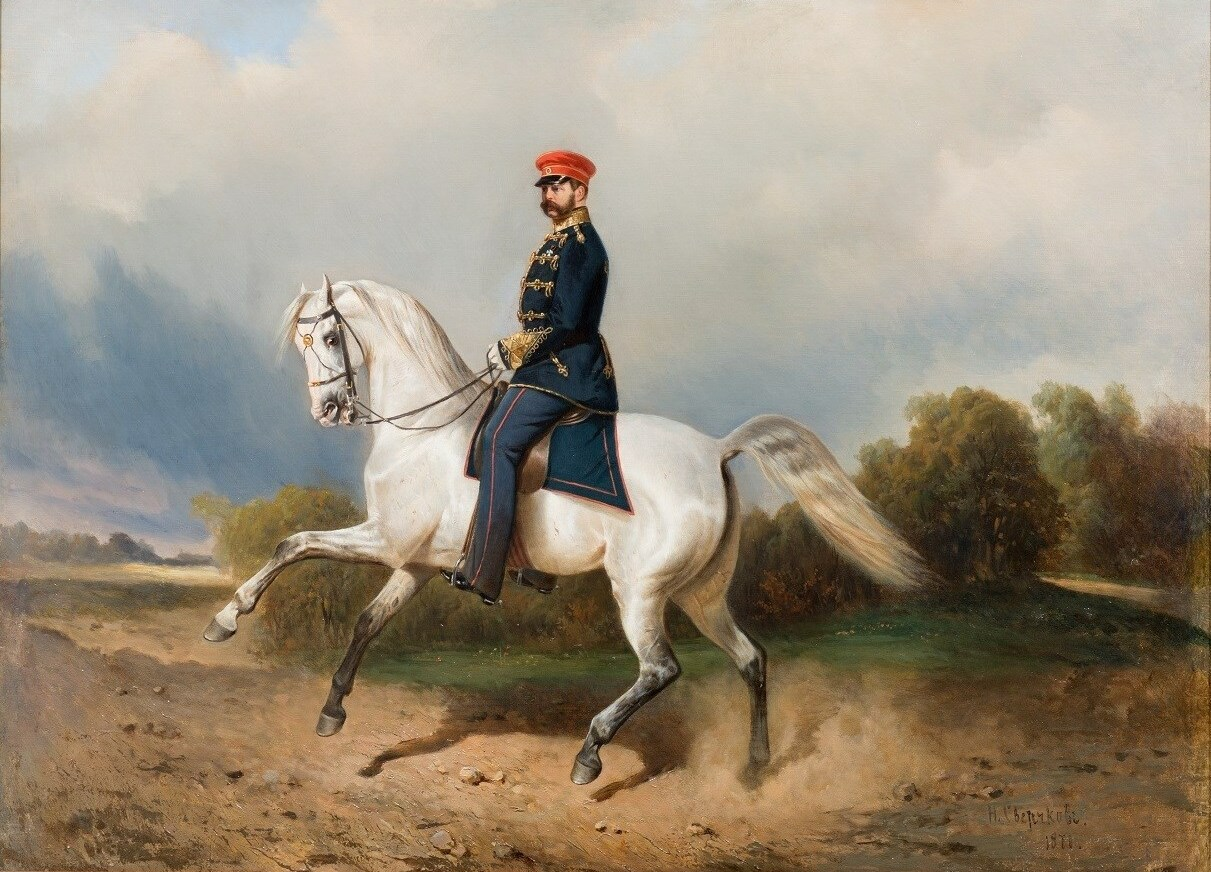
Emperor Alexander II (1871)

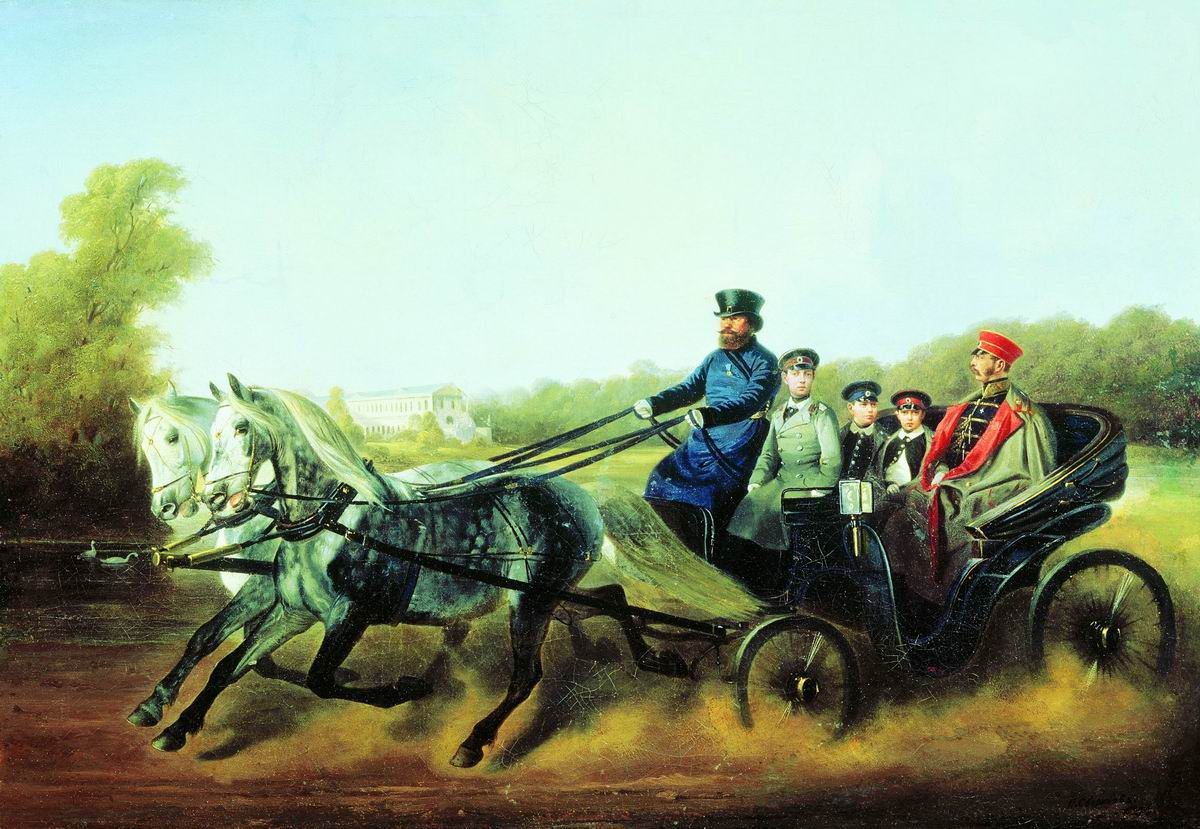
Emperor Alexander II with his children in a stroller

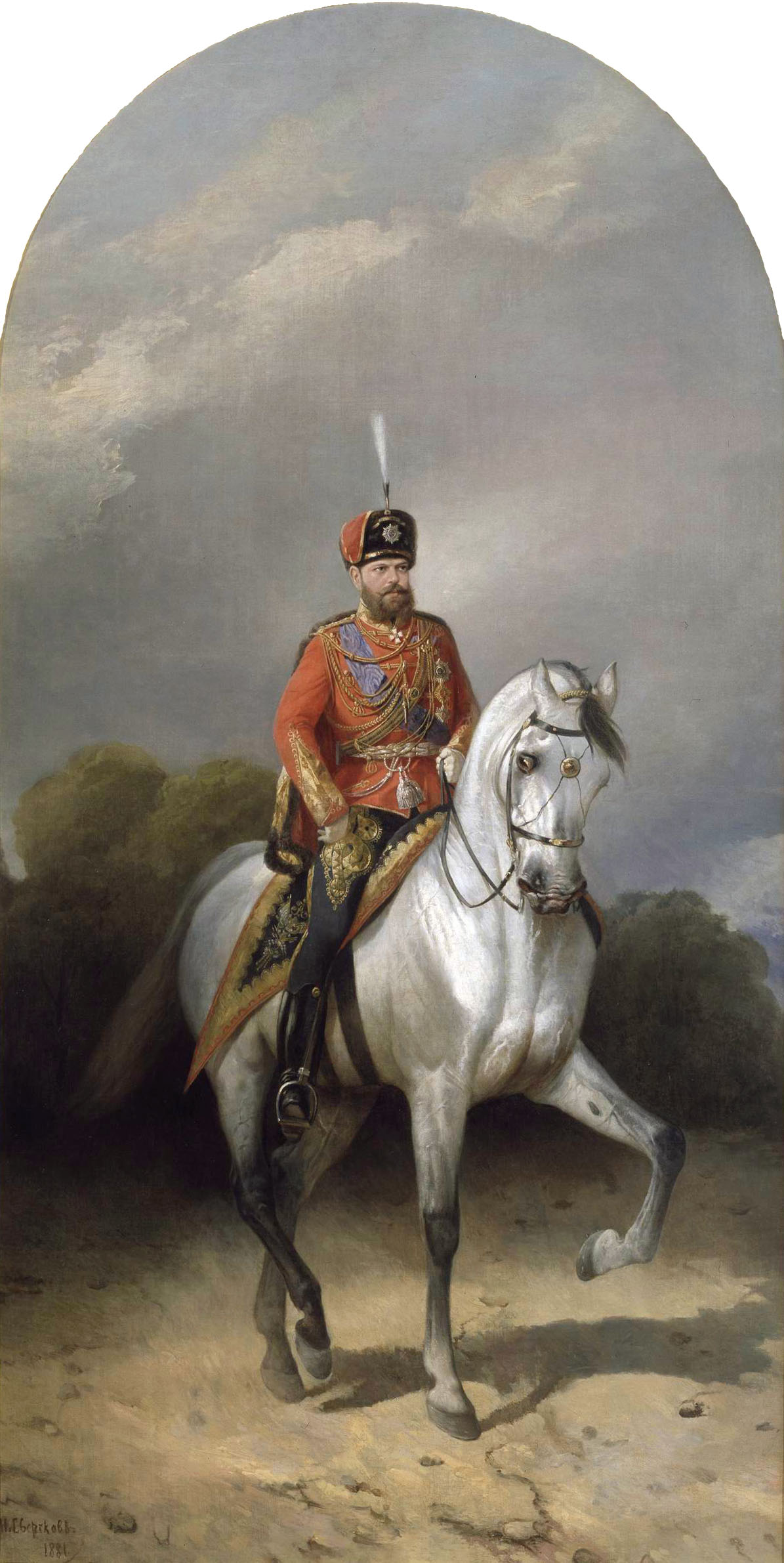
Emperor Alexander III (1881)

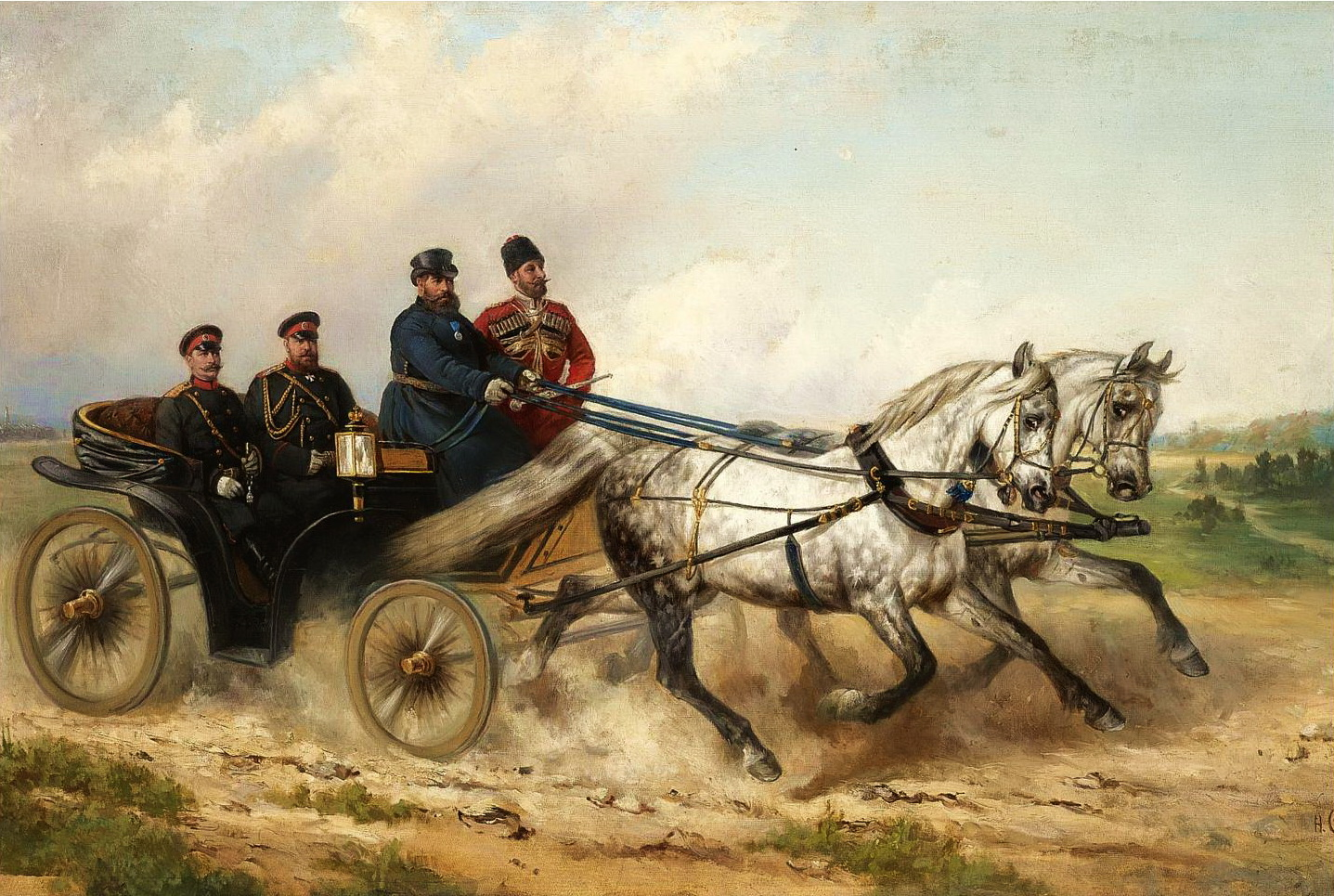
Emperor Alexander III and Kaiser Wilhelm in the open landau (1888)
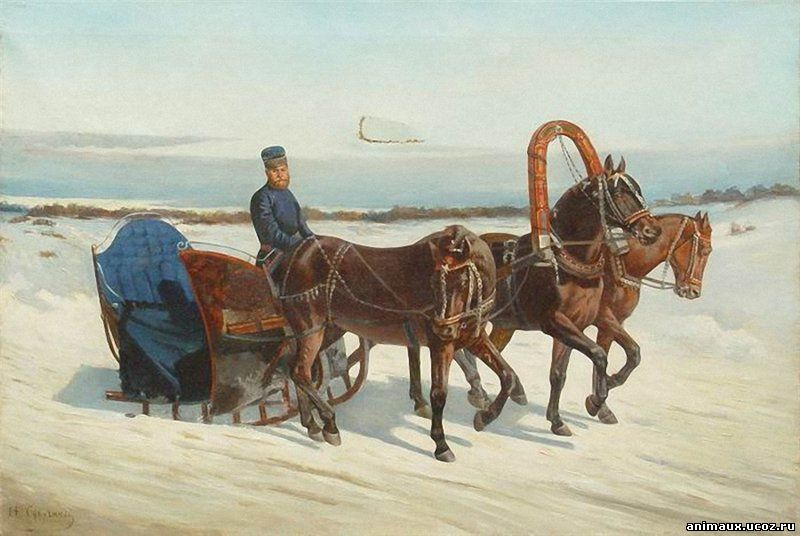
Troika (1848)

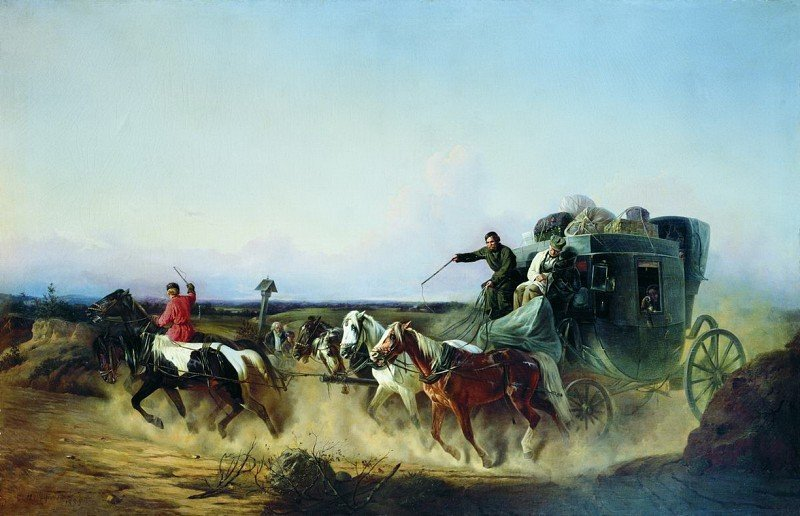
Landlord in a Speeding Coach (1855)

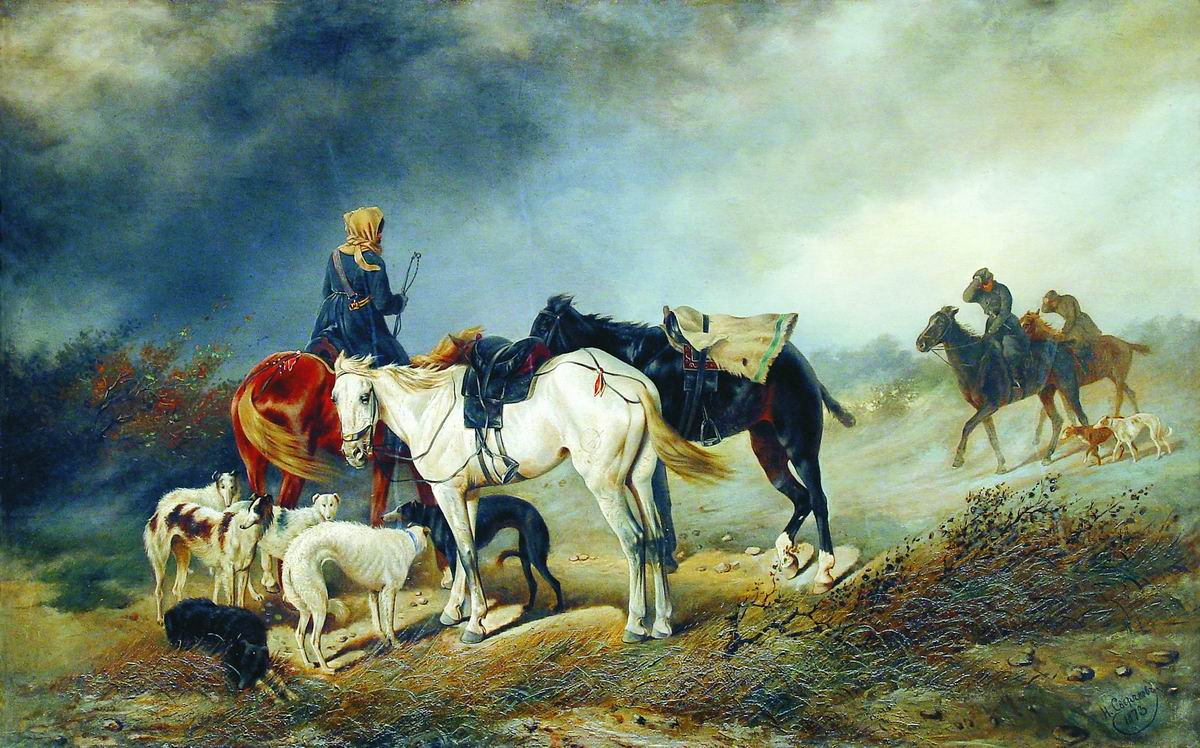
Hunters in the steppe (1873)

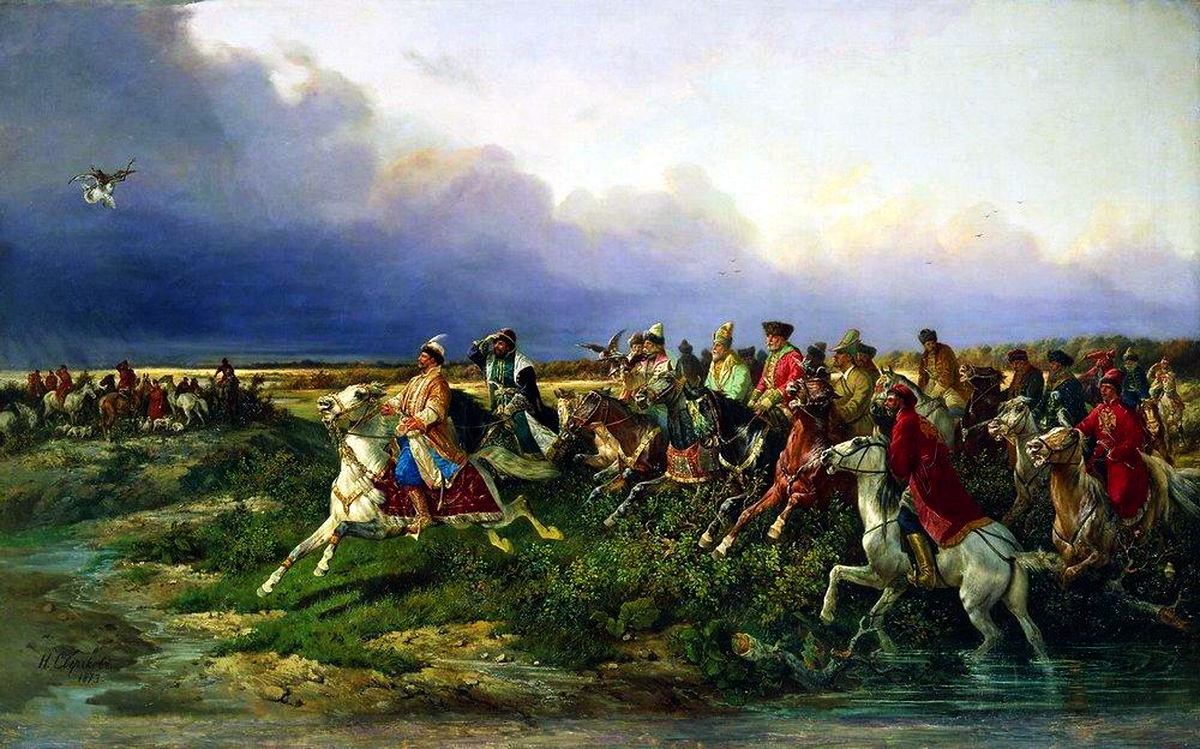
Falconry with Tsar Alexis I and his Boyars
