= Lovisa von Burghausen =

Swedish memoirist (1698–1733)

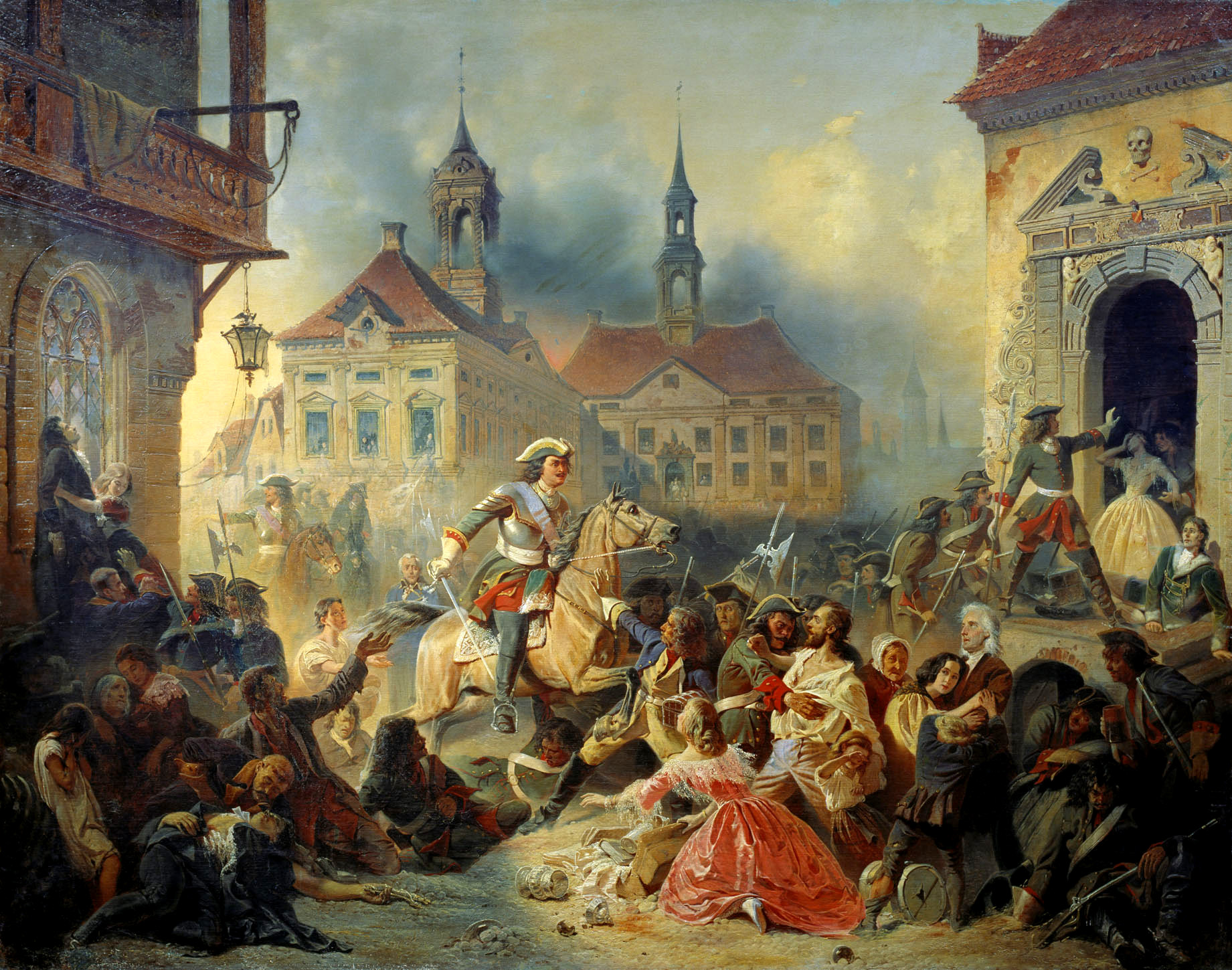
Peter I of Russia pacifies his marauding troops after taking Narva in 1704 by Nikolay Sauerweid, 1859

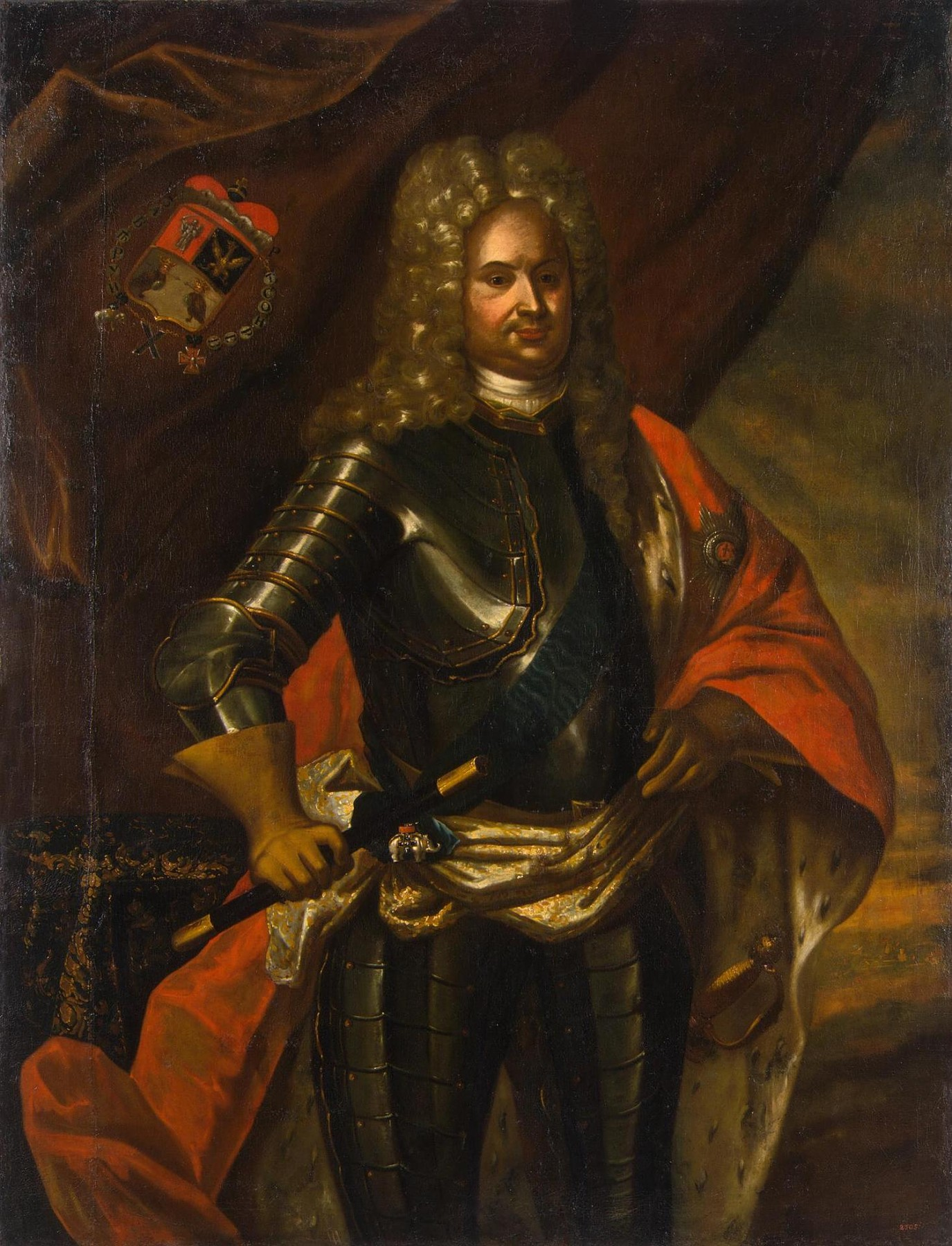
Field-Marshal Anikita I. Repnin

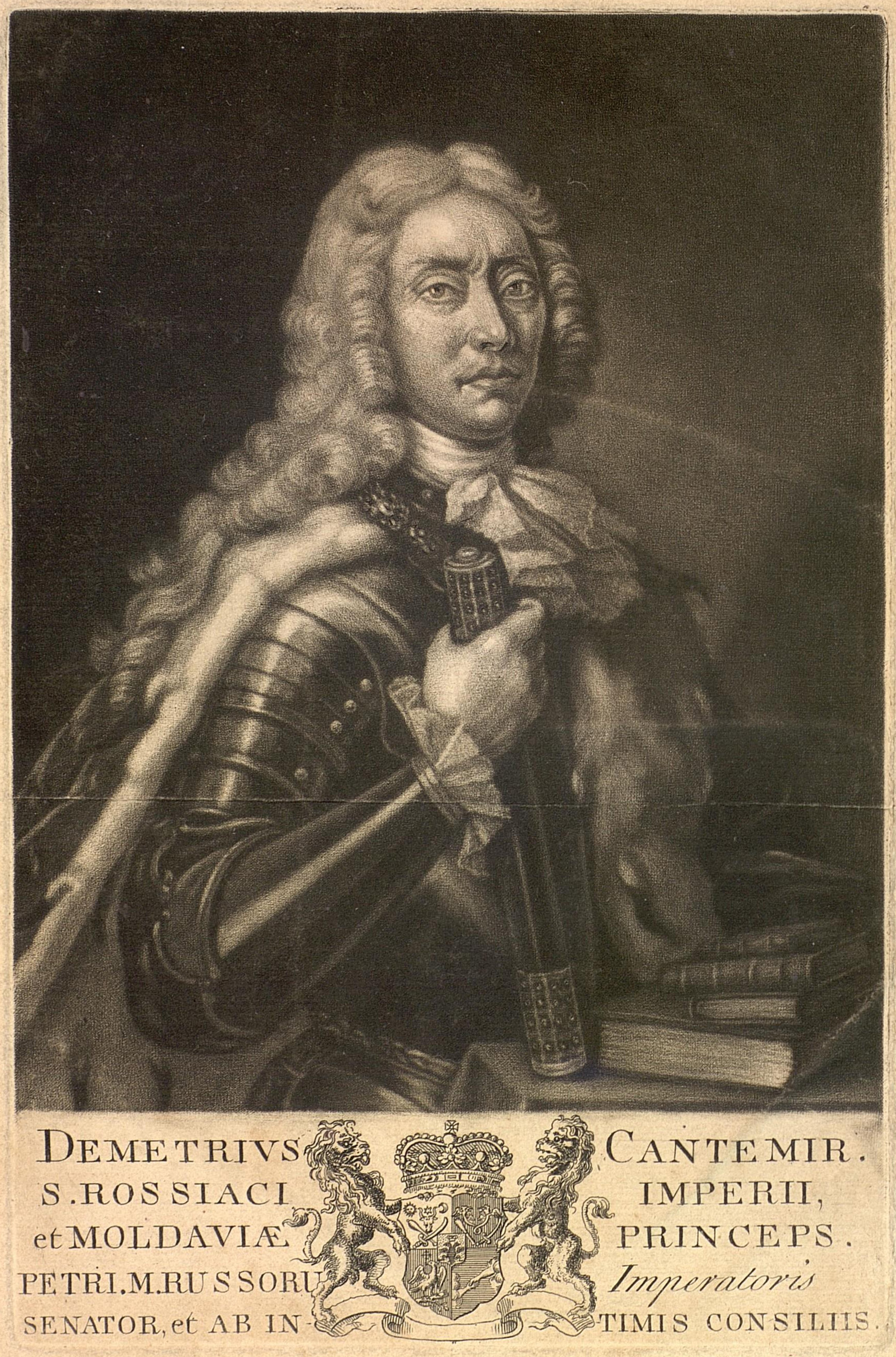
Dimitrie Cantemir

Lovisa von Burghausen (1698 – 20 January 1733) was a Swedish memoirist who became famous for her story about her time in captivity as a slave in Russia after being taken prisoner by the Russians during the Great Northern War. She was sold as a slave several times before she eventually recovered her freedom, and her story became perhaps the most famous of the many stories of Carolinian fates of this period.

== Kidnapped ==
Von Burghausen was born in the city of Narva in Swedish Estonia, one of five daughters to the noble Swedish major Gustaf von Burghausen and Margareta von Brundert. Her father had been taking part in the defence of the city when it was taken by the Russians after the Battle of Narva (1704).

During the chaotic pillage of the city, von Burghausen was separated from her family and taken captive by a Russian soldier. It was a common practice for individual Russian soldiers and militaries to take civilians captive, whom they sold as slaves, and many of the citizens of Narva, both Swedes and Estonians, were to be sold at the slave markets in Russia, Persia, and the Ottoman Empire, and among the others taken captive this way during the war the future Empress Catherine I of Russia and, possibly, Yefrosinya Fedorov. Von Burghausen's parents and sisters were taken captive as prisoners of war and deported to Siberia.

On the way to the Russian camp, another soldier demanded to have her, and when the first one claimed that he intended to give her as a present to his captain, the second one wounded her in the chest with his sabre. She fainted and woke up in a tent, where she cried for her mother until her throat was so swollen up she lost her voice and lost consciousness.

== The first master ==
She was taken to Moscow and given as present to the Russian general Prince Anikita Repnin. He sent her to a nunnery for her to be converted to the Russian Orthodox faith, but unable to understand Russian, she was beaten as a pagan unwilling to convert. After three months, she was released from the convent by the intervention of the Prince's mother, the dowager princess, who showed her "all the tenderness of a mother." However, the prince's wife, Princess Prascovia Narischkyn, suspected her to be spying on the Prince's private affairs and often abused her. On one occasion, Narischkyn had von Burghausen hung upside down in the garden, which would have killed her had the old dowager princess not intervened once again.

She was to accompany the princely family to Ukraine in 1709 and witness the Swedish army and prisoners march in under Russian captivity in the triumph of the czar Peter the Great in Moscow. In 1710, she was married to the chamberlain of the Prince, a sixteen-year-old Swedish son of an ensign, Johan, himself a captive and fostered in the Orthodox faith. Von Burghausen had a daughter who died six weeks later.

In 1713, Johan died from being shot in the leg during battle. The same year, Prince Dimitrie Cantemir, hospodar of Moldavia, a Russian ally at the time, visited Moscow with his family. During a visit to the Repnins, his wife, Kassandra Cantacuzene, gave Princess Prascovia a diamond as a gift; she noticed von Burghausen among the court of the princess, and Princess Prascovia then gave von Burghausen to Princess Cantemir as thanks for the diamond.

== Second master ==
Princess Cantemir died the same year, and von Burghausen was poisoned by the wife of the baker of the Cantemir court, who wanted von Burghausen's place for her daughter, and only with good medical help was she saved. When an Armenian captain asked the Prince to give Lovisa to him as a wife, she escaped and, on the advice of a fellow Swedish woman employed at the court, sought refuge at the home of an English merchant in the German Quarter of Moscow.

The English merchant sent her to Arkhangelsk to be educated in the Protestant religion and to learn German. After seven weeks, she was reported by a German tailor, arrested by the Russian police and taken back to prince Cantemir. She was chained by her hands and feet and nails were hammered through her shoes to make it difficult for her to walk, which made her feet and legs swollen. She was put to wash clothes in a stone-kitchen so cold that her arms were covered with ice. She would have frozen to death if it were not for the daughters of the prince, Maria Cantemir and Smaragda; they bribed the guard to fold her chains in cloth, to prevent it from giving any sound, and take her up to their bedchamber at night.

== Third master ==
In 1714, prince Cantemir traveled to Saint Petersburg and left his household under the supervision of a captain Iwanof and his wife. The wife of Iwanof took Lovisa, together with two other female slaves, one from Finland and one from Narva, to the Russian slave market in Moscow and sold them all. The Finnish woman was sold to an Armenian, the woman from Narva to a Russian clerk, and von Burghausen to a Turkish merchant. She was sold for a bit of damask, a fan and a smaller sum of money. She was put among the merchandise in the sleigh of the merchant, mostly consisted of carpets, threatened with beating if she screamed, and was taken towards Tobolsk in Siberia.

During the journey, a Russian clerk saw von Burghausen crying in an inn, and asked her what had happened. She told him her story, and he reported it to the voivod of Solikamsk. In Solikamsk, the voivod questioned the Turk, but let them go when the Turk told him that the person in his sleigh was an old Russian woman. They then left Solikamsk without knowing, that this was the city where the parents of Lovisa lived as prisoners of war.

At the home of the Turk in Tobolsk, von Burghausen was put to hard labour and badly beaten every time she made a mistake of sheer exhaustion. Tobolsk was, however, the city in Siberia containing the largest colony of Swedish prisoners of war, who were allowed to live there quite freely. Von Burghausen took contact with a Swedish woman, who advised her to contact the Swedish lieutenant Magnus Vilhelm Sprengtporten; Sprengtporten had been taken prisoner at Narva the same time as von Burghausen, escaped, been taken prisoner at the Battle of Poltava, lead a rebellion at Kazan and been imprisoned for seventeen months. Lovisa was later to say about him that he was her "greatest saviour next to God".

== Runaway slave ==
One day, she left the house of the Turk to buy silk at the market, accompanied by a guard. The guard was distracted by a game of sports, and von Burghausen mixed with the crowd and made contact with Sprengtporten, who took her to his friend Mattias Johan Reutercrona, where she remained hidden for eleven weeks. The Turk issued a reward of §100 and the police put a guard round the house, but Sprengporten helped her pass the guards by giving her a pack of clothes and saying that she was his maid on her way to the tailor's.

She was taken to the house of Christoffer Laudau, which were searched after a tip from a servant who wanted the reward, during which she had to hide three days in water under a tub in the basement. She was then hidden in a number of houses. Once in the house of her mother's relative, Lovisa Patkull, who lived in a house belonging to the vice governor; during a visit from the vice governor, Patkull put her in bed claiming her to be her sick niece.

Reutercrona and Sprengtporten were arrested, suspected of aiding her to escape, and she was arranged to be taken from the city to Japantskin on her way to her parents in Solikamsk by a Russian farmer. The son of the farmer, Stefan, was kept as security, and Lovisa was dressed as a boy and left with the farmer by sleigh. In a village, the villagers suspected her to be the disguised son of a noble, and planned to kill her in her sleep. A maid warned her and Lovisa jumped out of the cottage to the farmer, who was feeding the horse, and up to the sleigh, and they quickly fled from the village. During the night, they rested on the side of the road, and soon after, they heard noise and then saw the villagers hunting after them with dogs. Luckily, it was snowing, and their traces were concealed.

In Japantskin, von Burghausen was taken care of by the Swedish priest Anders Bergner. The Swedish noblewoman Anna von Knorring, who was visiting her daughters in Klinov, obtained a pass for von Burghausen as her niece, and they then traveled together to Solikamsk, where Lovisa was directed to her parents in the Swedish colony by the Swedish army priest Christoffer von der Heide on Christmas morning 1718.

== Later life ==
Von Burghausen was now alone with her parents after all of her sisters had been married to officers. Her parents arranged for her to be instructed in Lutheranism by the priest of the Swedish colony, Lars Sandmark. In 1720, her parents forced her to marry the thirty years older priest, which she did "with childlike obedience." When the Swedish prisoners were released after the war in 1721, she followed her husband to Sweden, where he was appointed vicar in Njurunda in Medelpad. Contemporary accounts say that she made the home bright with her kindness towards others. In 1729, she became a widow, and in 1731, she married her husband's successor, Petrus Sundberg, in accordance with the cultural practice of widow conservation. She died childless in 1733 after the bad health she had after her time as a slave.

== Legacy ==
The story of Lovisa von Burghausen was written down by "an honest man of the priest cloth" after her words and was read at her funeral. It is now kept at Biografica in the National Archives of Sweden.

In 2021, the metal band Carolus released the album To the Fallen Sons with the song Lovisa dedicated to her.

== Context ==
Many Swedish, Finnish and Baltic people, especially women and children, had been sold as slaves in Russia and Turkey during the Great Northern War after having been taken captive by Russian soldiers, particularly after the fall of Narva in 1704. Many were then sold to Slavery in the Ottoman Empire in the slave market in Istanbul via the Black Sea slave trade. From June 1710, the Swedish ambassador Thomas Funck regularly visited the slave auctions in Istanbul to buy Swedish citizens, and Sven Agrell noted that they, among others, had bought a "carpenter's daughter" from Narva for §82, a "Captain's wife" for §240, Catharina Pereswetoff-Morath, eighteen years old, for §275 and a whole family, Anders Jonsson and his wife and children, though the funds were not always enough to buy all. The people bought free were probably taken to the camp of the king Charles XII of Sweden in Moldavia and returned to Sweden with him.

In the peace treaty of 1721, the Russian czar allowed all prisoners in Russia to return home, except those who had converted to the Russian religion, as this was considered to make them Russian citizens; but as the Swedish slaves had been forced to convert to the orthodox faith by their masters, they were kept in Russia. If it could be proven that they had been forced to convert, they would sometimes be let free, but forced to stay as free Russian citizens instead; the forced conversions could generally not be proven. The story of Lovisa von Burghausen is the perhaps best known of the many women being taken as slaves during this war.

== See also ==
- Brigitta Scherzenfeldt
- Annika Svahn
- Afrosinya
- List of slaves
- Kustaa Lillbäck
