= Bäckaskog =

Swedish locality

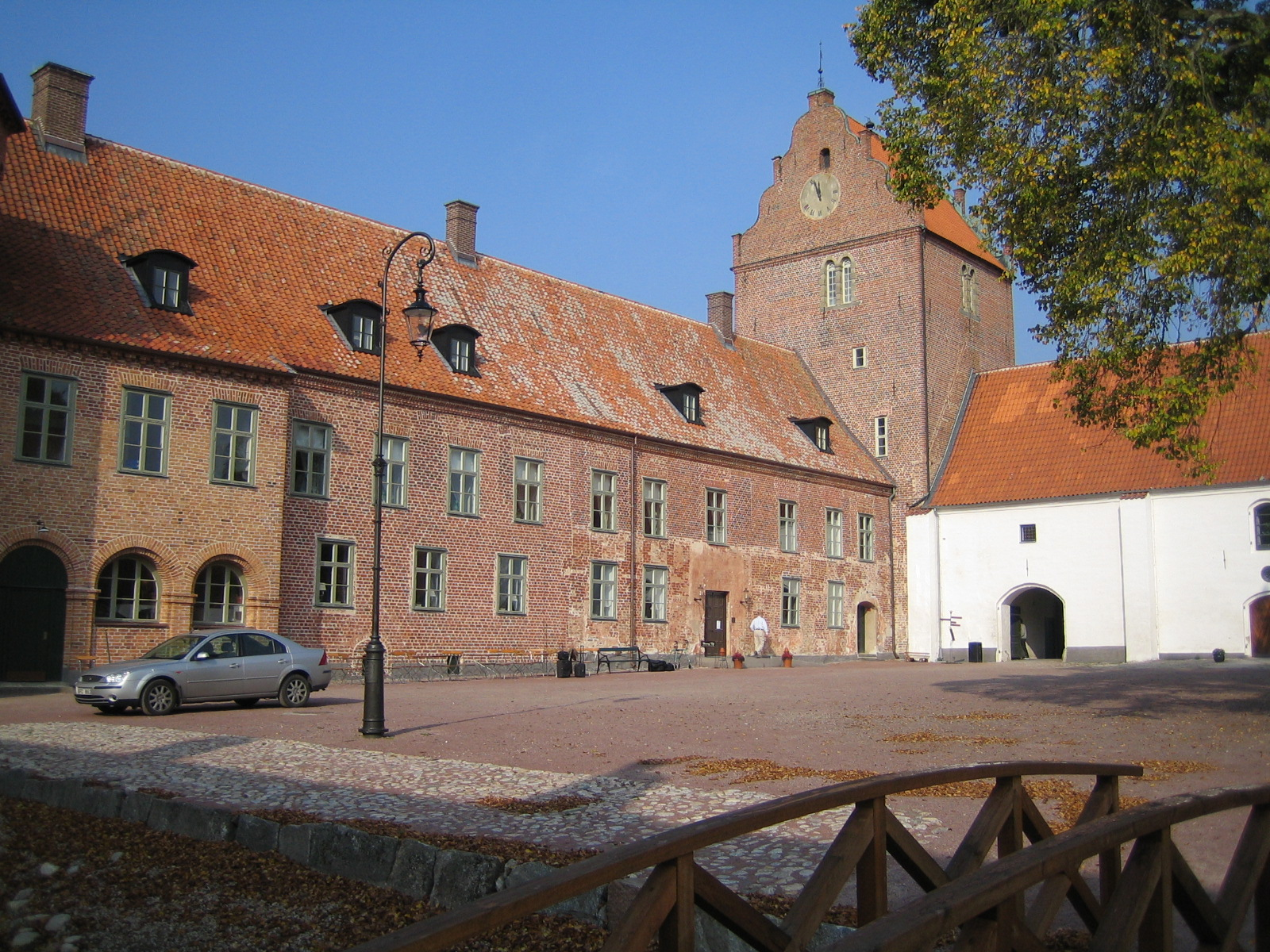
- Bäckaskog Castle

- Location within Skåne Location within Sweden
- Coordinates: 56°03′N 14°20′E
- Country: Sweden
- Province: Skåne
- County: Skåne County
- Municipality: Kristianstad Municipality

Area
  - Total: 0.38 km^{2} (0.15 sq mi)

Population (31 December 2010)
  - Total: 293
  - Density: 771/km^{2} (2,000/sq mi)
- Time zone: UTC+1 (CET)
  - Summer (DST): UTC+2 (CEST)

Bäckaskog is a locality situated in Kristianstad Municipality, Skåne County, Sweden, between Ivö Lake and Oppmanna Lake, with a population of 293 inhabitants in 2010.

The village has developed around the castle and the Premonstratensian monastery. The monastery was constructed in the early 14th century and after the destruction of the monastery in Vä, the monks from there wer relocated to Bäckaskog.

With the Danish Reformation, the monastery was converted into a castle and granted to Danish nobles of the families of Ulfstand, Brahe, Bille, Parsberg and eventually the Scanian family of Ramel. The castle also came into the possession of Swedish King Charles XV and Danish Crown Prince Fredrik between 1885 and 1900. It was here in 1805 that a treaty was signed between England and Sweden, whereby Sweden joined the war against Napoleon.

Bäckaskog was connected to neighbouring towns of Sölvesborg and Kristianstad via the main road (now E22) and had a railway station, servicing also nearby castle of Trolle-Ljungby Castle, along the Sölvesborg-Kristianstad-Railroad.

Allegedly (Nordisk Familjebok) the name refers to the Swedish words for stream – bäck and forest – skog in that the place held them both.
