= Želešice =

- Municipality
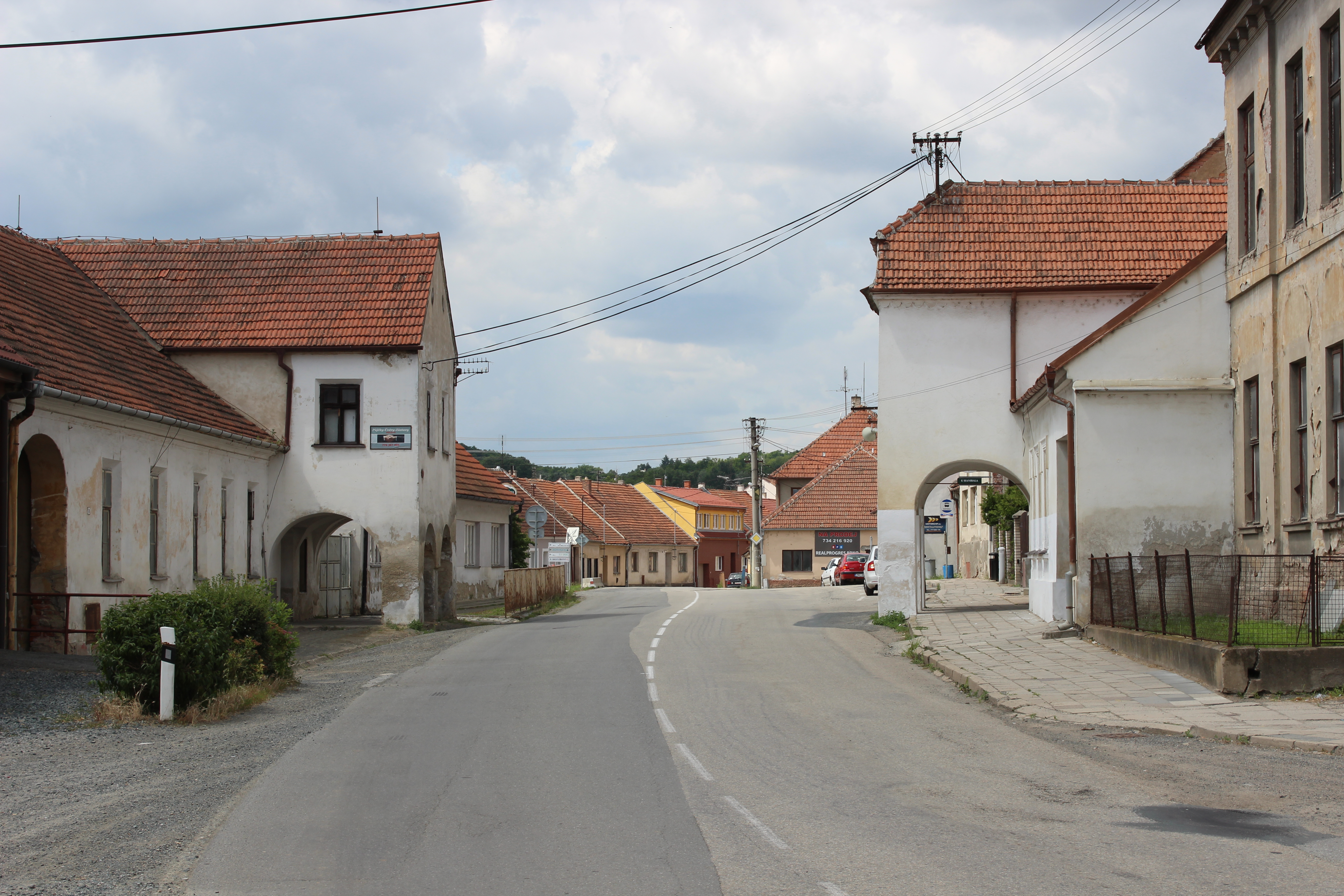
- Main street

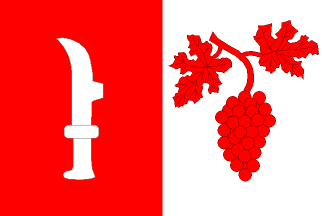
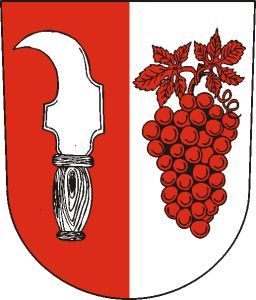
- Flag Coat of arms

- Location in the Czech Republic
- Coordinates: 49°7′0″N 16°34′53″E
- Country: Czech Republic
- Region: South Moravian
- District: Brno-Country
- First mentioned: 1228

Area
  - Total: 9.97 km^{2} (3.85 sq mi)
- Elevation: 210 m (690 ft)

Population (2026-01-01)
  - Total: 2,005
  - Density: 201/km^{2} (521/sq mi)
- Time zone: UTC+1 (CET)
  - Summer (DST): UTC+2 (CEST)
- Postal code: 664 43
- Website: www.zelesice.eu

Želešice is a municipality and village in Brno-Country District in the South Moravian Region of the Czech Republic. It has about 2,000 inhabitants.

== Geography ==
Želešice is located about 8 kilometres (5 mi) south of Brno. It lies on the border between the Dyje–Svratka Valley and Bobrava Highlands. The highest point is the hill Kozí horka at 356 m (1,168 ft) above sea level. The Bobrava River flows through the municipality.

== History ==
The first written mention of Želešice is in a deed of King Ottokar I from 1228.

== Demographics ==
Historical population

Year	Pop.	±%
1869	952	—
1880	981	+3.0%
1890	986	+0.5%
1900	987	+0.1%
1910	1,031	+4.5%

Year	Pop.	±%
1921	1,076	+4.4%
1930	1,115	+3.6%
1950	1,117	+0.2%
1961	1,136	+1.7%
1970	1,175	+3.4%

Year	Pop.	±%
1980	1,200	+2.1%
1991	1,171	−2.4%
2001	1,175	+0.3%
2011	1,549	+31.8%
2021	1,803	+16.4%

Source: Censuses

== Economy ==
In the northwestern part of Želešice is an amphibolite quarry.

== Transport ==
There are no railways or major roads passing through the municipality. The D52 motorway runs southeast of Želešice, just outside the municipality.

== Sights ==
Church of the Immaculate Conception

The main landmark of Želešice is the Church of the Immaculate Conception. It was built in the late Gothic style at the end of the 15th century and modified in the late Baroque style. There is a valuable stone cross in front of the gate to the church grounds, which was created in 1827.

== Notable people ==
- Georg Benedikt von Ogilvy (1651–1710), Polish-Saxon military leader
