= Kustaa Lillbäck =

Finnish military personnel (1700–1721)

Kustaa Lillbäck (1700–1721) was a Finnish-Russian serf and soldier.

== Life ==
Lillbäck was born in Finland, which was then a part of Sweden. During the Great Northern War (1700–1721), Finland was occupied and pillaged by Russia from 1713 to 1721. Many Finnish people were abducted by Russians during the Great Wrath, and either trafficked to slavery in the Middle East via the Crimean slave trade, or enslaved in Russia itself. Lillbäck was one of the many victims of this slave trade when he was abducted in 1715. In his case, he was enslaved in Russia.

After having agreed to convert to the Russian Orthodox faith, he was manumitted and included to serve in the Russian army. He was placed to serve in the Russian Army occupying his native Finland. During his service in Finland, he participated in the atrocities committed by the Russian occupying forces in Finland. He was viewed by the Finns as a traitor and became infamous for his participation in the war atrocities committed by the Russians against the Finnish civilian population.

After the peace between Sweden and Russia in 1721, the Russian forces left Finland. Lillbäck was captured and executed as a traitor and collaborator.

== In fiction ==
Lillbäck and his life was the subject of the novel Paholaisen sota (Swedish: Djävulens krig: förrädaren Gustav Lillbäck och stora nordiska kriget 1700–1721, "Devil's war: the traitor Gustav Lillbäck and the great northern war 1700–1721") by Kustaa H. J. Vilkuna.

== See also ==
- Annika Svahn
- Lovisa von Burghausen
- Afrosinya
