= Annika Svahn =

Finnish prisoner of war (fl. 1714)

Annika Svahn (also Swahn; fl. 1714) was a Finnish prisoner of war during the Great Northern War. The daughter of a vicar, she became the perhaps most well known victim of the abuse suffered by the civilian population in Finland during the Russian occupation known as the Greater Wrath.

== Biography ==
Annika Svahn was the daughter of the vicar in Joutseno, Benjamin Swahn. After the death of her father in 1701, when she was very young, her mother was allowed to remain in the vicarage as the house keeper of her father's successor, and she worked there as a maid. In midsummer 1710, Svahn fell victim to the slave trade during the Great Wrath; she was abducted naked from her sauna by a group of Russian soldiers and brought as a slave to Saint Petersburg. In Saint Petersburg, she, as well as a couple of other Finnish females, were given some military training. In 1713, she was re-baptized in the Russian orthodox faith as Uliana. She was given a dragoon uniform and, alongside other Finnish women with a similar history, she was ordered to Finland to assist the Russian army in its conquest of Finland. She was wounded by a bullet in her thigh outside Porvoo (Borgå) in 1714. The same year, she was given the task to act as a messenger for the Russians. She planned to desert, but was captured by the Swedish army on her way. She made her confession for the Swedish army authorities, who documented it. It is not known what happened to her after this.

== Legacy ==
An opera and television show gave her legendary status.

== See also ==
- Kustaa Lillbäck
- Lovisa von Burghausen
- Afrosinya

== Sources ==
- Suomen kansallisbiografia (National Biography of Finland)
- https://web.archive.org/web/20121101153825/http://lappeenranta.fi/Suomeksi/Palvelut/Kirjasto/Etela-Karjala-aineisto/Joutsenolaisia_tarinoita/Annikka_Swahn%2C_tsaarin_rakuuna.iw3
