= Afrosinya =

Mistress of Alexei Petrovich (c. 1700 – c. 1750)

Afrosinya Fedorova (Note: Also transliterated in English as Afrosinia, Afrosina, or Afrosin'ia. She signed her name as Eyfrasiniia or Efrosiniia Fedorova doch', Efrosiniia, Fedor's daughter.) (Russian: Ефросинья Фёдорова, romanized: Yefrosinya Fyodorova; c. 1700 – c. 1750) was a Finnish woman sold into Russian serfdom after being captured in war. She became the concubine of Alexei Petrovich, Tsarevich of Russia, son and heir of Peter the Great and fled with him on 26 September 1716 from his father. Information provided by her was crucial in sentencing Alexei to death after their return to Russia.

== Early life ==
Afrosinya was born around 1700, perhaps near the future Saint Petersburg, an area not yet taken by Russia but at the time a part of the Swedish Empire. During the Great Northern war she fell victim of the slave trade during the Great Wrath when she was captured with her brother, Ivan, and sold as serfs to Prince Nikifor Kondrat'evich Viazemskii, former tutor of Alexei Petrovich, Tsarevich of Russia.

Afrosinya was consistently described as short, and she could live disguised, suggesting that she was thin. One description of her states that she was 'tall, hefty, thick-lipped, with red hair'. This might be a forgery, but has nevertheless been used as the basis of Afrosinya's depiction.

== Mistress of the Tsarevich ==
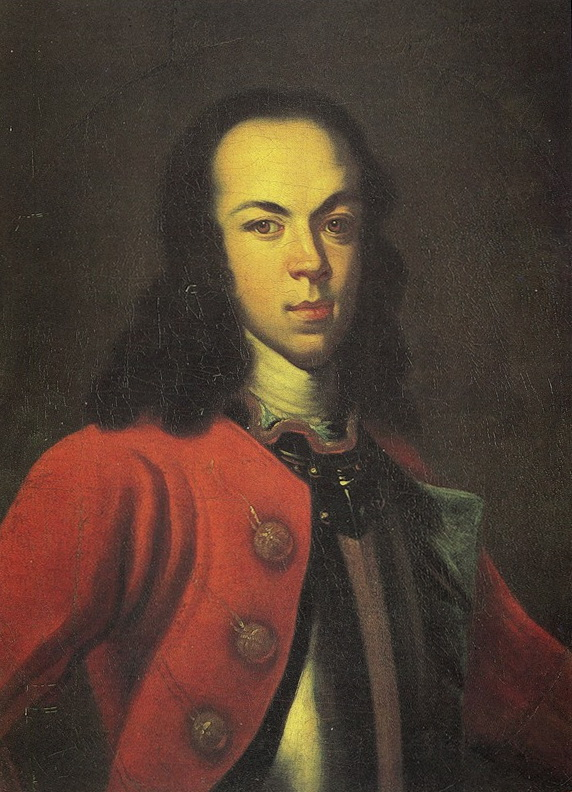
Tsarevitch Alexei Petrovich in 1710–1715.

Alexei was unhappily married to Charlotte of Brunswick-Wolfenbüttel, whom he mistreated. According to Massie, he fell in love with Afrosinya in his friend Viazemskii's house, and he gifted her to him; she was fifteen or sixteen at the time. Abbott claims that Alexei raped Afrosinya at knifepoint and forced her to become his concubine, but later grew to love her. However, he never trusted her as he knew that she was only with him because she had no other choice. He ensured that she would comply but remain unable to betray him by manipulation, omissions, and lies. He based this account on an allegation by a contemporary, who stated that in 1717 Afrosinya testified that the Tsarevich had 'forced her to comply with his Will with a Knife drawn, and threatening [sic] her with Death'. There is no account of such an accusation from her, nor any other evidence that she was forced. She was likely freed in 1715, as her brother Ivan (who had been moved with her to Alexei's household) certainly was.

Despite conflicting interpretations, it is not known how or when their relationship started. It probably begun some time before Afrosinya's 1715 arrival in Alexei's household, but likely not much earlier. A contemporary observer described her as a 'Finlandish Woman a Captive', and said that the Tsarevich was 'never out of her Company Night or Day'. She has been viewed with contempt for her ethnicity; a contemporary letter expresses the perplexion of Russians that the Tsarevitch could love 'such a mean Finn-woman', and multiple 19th century accounts of their relationship, as well as the fictional versions based on them, characterised her as 'bestial' or 'goatish', 'of the slightly bestial type of her race'.

Many accounts depicted her as the archetypal 'self-seeking Whore', opposed to Alexei's wife, the 'self-sacrificing Madonna', especially as Charlotte died soon after Afrosinya's arrival, on 2 November 1715, from a postpartum infection. Especially early biographers (both non-fiction and fiction) of Peter and Alexei considered her 'vain', 'vulgar', 'ignorant', 'cunning', and 'devoid of principles', 'ready to sell herself to anyone' and regularly having sex with other men besides Alexei. There is no proof that she had any other relationships at this time, or that she was, or was seen by Alexei, as a prostitute. Instead, it seems that they both planned to marry. Alexei told his valet to respect Afrosinya as his future wife, while Afrosinya reportedly talked about a planned future marriage before their flight.

They lived together in the right wing of the Alexei's palace, while Charlotte and her daughter Natalya Alexeyevna inhabited the left wing. Alexei's treatment of his wife and his relationship with Afrosinya provoked his father's anger, as he had already been dissatisfied with him.

== Flight and exile ==
As a result of disagreements and distrust between them, Alexei had a contentious relationship with his father. In January 1716, the Emperor demanded that Alexei choose between becoming a monk or the next emperor; Alexei wanted neither. The conflict escalated, and there were rumours that the Emperor would harm his son. Alexei fled Russia on 26 September 1716 on borrowed money, taking Afrosinya, her brother, and three servants with him. Abbott claims that they were told that the destination was Copenhagen (where the Emperor was). In order not to arouse Afrosinya's suspicion, as she knew that the Emperor would not tolerate her, she was told that she would travel until Riga, then return to Saint Petersburg. In Königsberg, Afrosinya and Alexei's other companions were told that they would go instead to Vienna on the Peter's orders. Alexei used the pseudonym Kokhansky.

On 10 November, they arrived in Vienna. Alexei begged protection from his brother-in-law, Charles VI, Holy Roman Emperor. Charles wrote to King George I of Great Britain that he considered Peter capable of murdering his heir. He hoped that Alexei would become his puppet in Russia, and therefore hid him with his company in Ehrenberg Castle. The staff was told that a noble Hungarian or Pole was staying there, and no one was allowed to leave. Afrosinya was disguised as a page.

Alexei was discovered after five months by two spies sent by his father, who bribed a clerk in the Imperial Chancery. Unwilling to hand Alexei back to his father, Charles sent the couple to Naples. Afrosinya became visibly pregnant, and was discovered to be female and Alexei's mistress. They lived in the Castel Sant'Elmo but were again discovered by the spies. The diplomat Count Pyotr Andreyevich Tolstoy was sent to convince Alexei to return. The Count told Christine Louise, the Duchess of Brunswick Wolfenbüttel, mother-in-law to both Alexei and Emperor Charles, that her grandson, Alexei's son, could be disinherited together with his father. She pressured the Emperor to send him back.

Alexei said he was willing to return to Russia if he could marry Afrosinya and live with her in the country. To coerce him, Count Tolstoi procured an order from the Viceroy of Naples that Afrosinya be separated from the Tsarevitch. During the night before their separation, Afrosinya is 'believed' to have convinced Alexei to return to Russia. Count Tolstoi made a promise that they would be allowed to marry and live in peace, which the Emperor confirmed in writing. Three days after they left Naples, they were offered protection by Sweden, but never received the message. The couple separated in Bologna, as Afrosinya travelled at a slower pace due to her pregnancy.

Little Father, Tsarevich Aleksei Petrovich, my love, I wish you long life for deigning to remember me: by God's grace I am in good health. [The child with whom she was pregnant] and I congratulate you, my lord, on the feast of Christmas. I wish to hear about your health. I inform you, my lord, that we arrived in Augsburg on 24 December in good health, thank God, and henceforth I trust in the divine mercy of Him Who protects us from every harm under His merciful hand.

— Letter from Afrosinya to Alexei, Christmas 1716, Quotes Gilchrist 1994

== Alexei's downfall ==
Alexei was increasingly desperate for her, and knelt before the Empress Catherine, his step-mother, on 14 April 1718, begging that she speed Afrosinya's arrival. At the end of the month, Afrosinya arrived in Saint Petersburg and was arrested. She was imprisoned, kept apart from Alexei, and interrogated by Prince Alexander Danilovich Menshikov and Count Tolstoy, who asked her 'leading questions'. Her confession was used to indict Alexei. Her child, born around this time, immediately disappeared, and nothing is known of its fate.

Alexei implicated many in his flight; his friends and followers were tortured and executed. However, he insisted that Afrosinya only carried his letters, unaware of their content. Afrosinya was shown the instruments of torture upon her arrival to prison, and she produced letters from Alexei to various prominent people, asking their protection from Peter. She said that Alexei promised to undo his fathers work, and signed a written statement against him. She was made to confront Alexei in front of Peter, where she testified that the Tsarevitch planned a coup, and wanted to flee to the Pope, but that she stopped him. The confrontation lead to a nervous collapse in Alexei.

Alexei was sentenced to death on 24 June, and died of wounds inflicted by the knout during the interrogation period on 26 June. For her cooperation, Afrosinya was let free and allowed to keep some belongings from Alexei's household. She probably married an officer of the Saint Petersburg garrison and died in her fifties.

== See also ==
- Lovisa von Burghausen
- Brigitta Scherzenfeldt
- Annika Svahn
- Kustaa Lillbäck
