= Křešice =

- Municipality
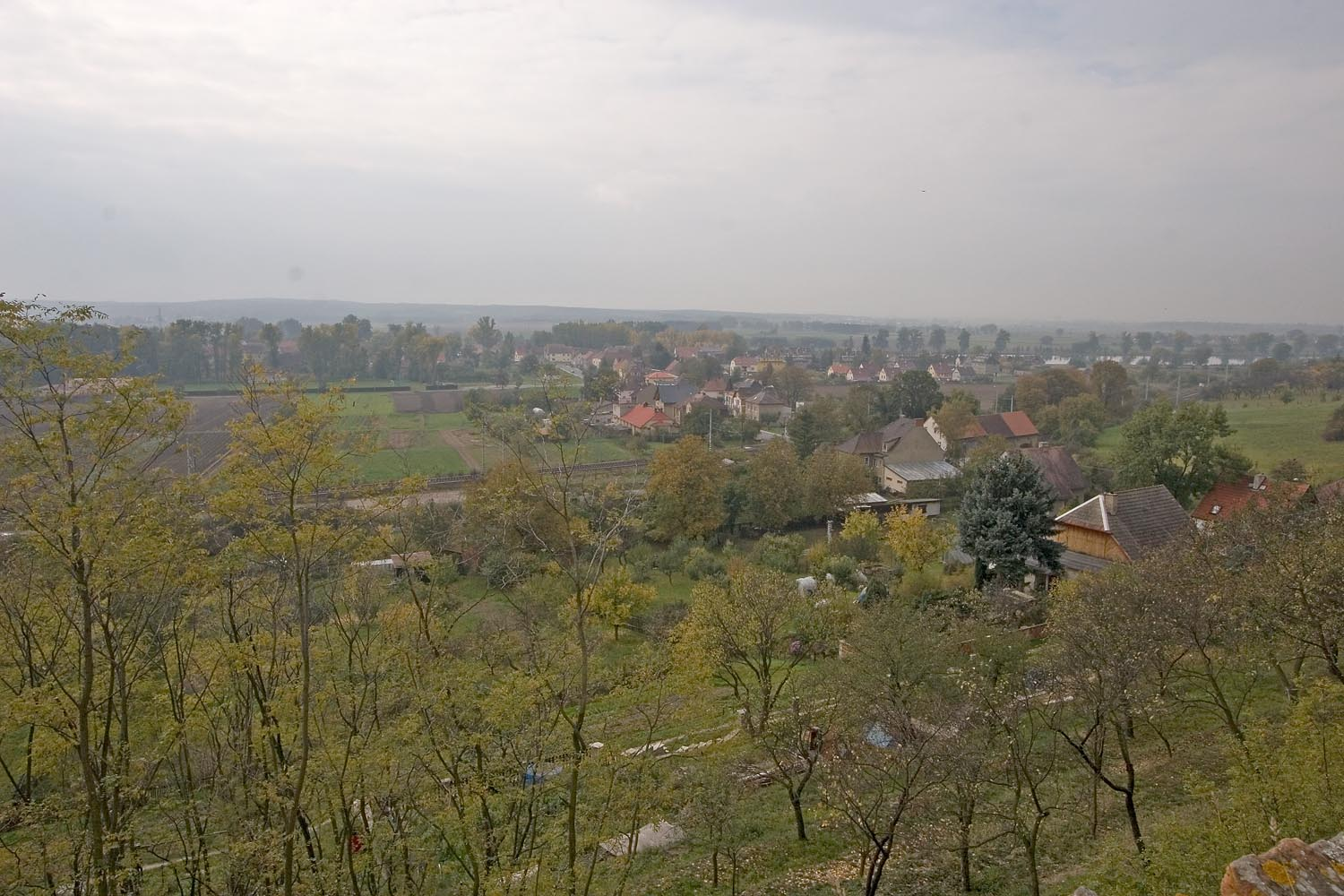
- Panorama of Křešice

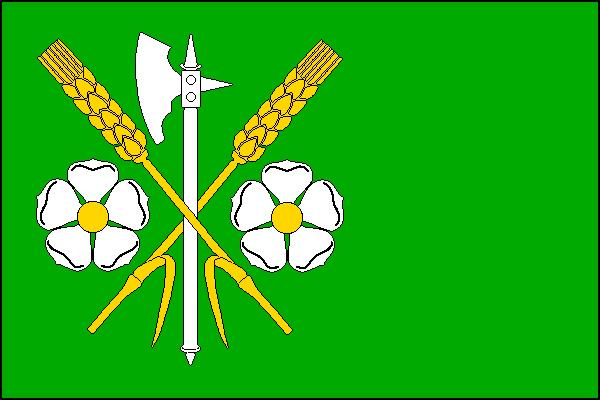
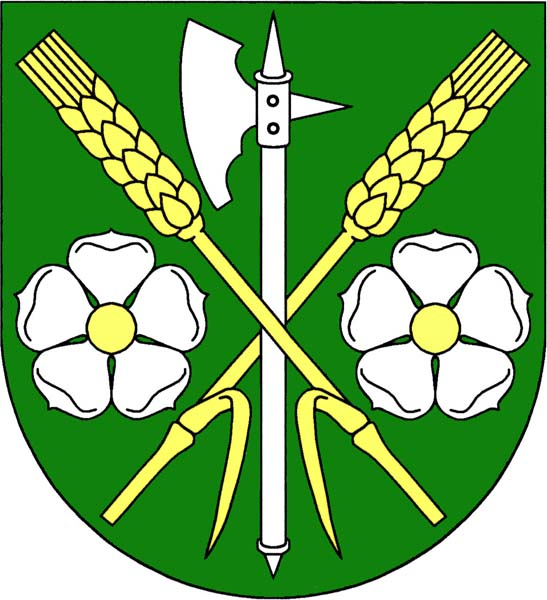
- Flag Coat of arms

- Location in the Czech Republic
- Coordinates: 50°31′22″N 14°12′53″E
- Country: Czech Republic
- Region: Ústí nad Labem
- District: Litoměřice
- First mentioned: 1057

Area
  - Total: 11.06 km^{2} (4.27 sq mi)
- Elevation: 153 m (502 ft)

Population (2026-01-01)
  - Total: 1,473
  - Density: 133.2/km^{2} (344.9/sq mi)
- Time zone: UTC+1 (CET)
  - Summer (DST): UTC+2 (CEST)
- Postal codes: 411 48, 412 01
- Website: www.kresice.cz

Křešice is a municipality and village in Litoměřice District in the Ústí nad Labem Region of the Czech Republic. It has about 1,500 inhabitants.

Křešice lies approximately 9 kilometres (6 mi) east of Litoměřice, 21 km (13 mi) south-east of Ústí nad Labem, and 50 km (31 mi) north of Prague.

== Administrative division ==
Křešice consists of five municipal parts (in brackets population according to the 2021 census):

- Křešice (817)
- Nučnice (142)
- Sedlec (35)
- Třeboutice (127)
- Zahořany (313)

== Demographics ==
Historical population
Year	Pop.	±%
1869	1,827	—
1880	1,785	−2.3%
1890	1,792	+0.4%
1900	1,689	−5.7%
1910	2,685	+59.0%
1921	2,315	−13.8%
1930	2,574	+11.2%
1950	1,735	−32.6%
1961	1,852	+6.7%
1970	1,797	−3.0%
1980	1,602	−10.9%
1991	1,358	−15.2%
2001	1,386	+2.1%
2011	1,462	+5.5%
2021	1,434	−1.9%
Source: Censuses
