= Bäckaskog Castle =

Building in Kristianstad Municipality, Scania, Sweden

- Bäckaskog slott
- Kristianstad Municipality
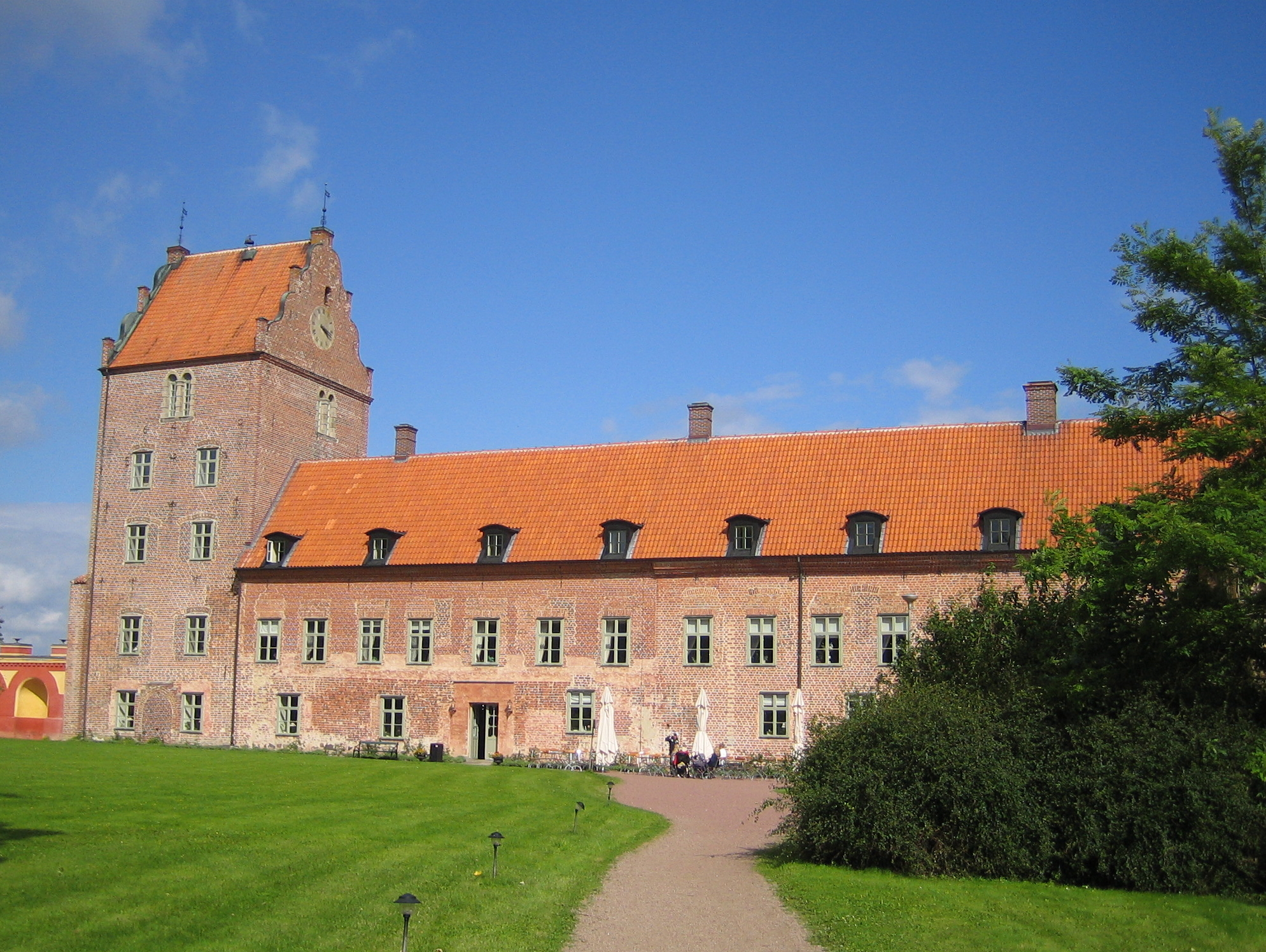
- Bäckaskog Castle

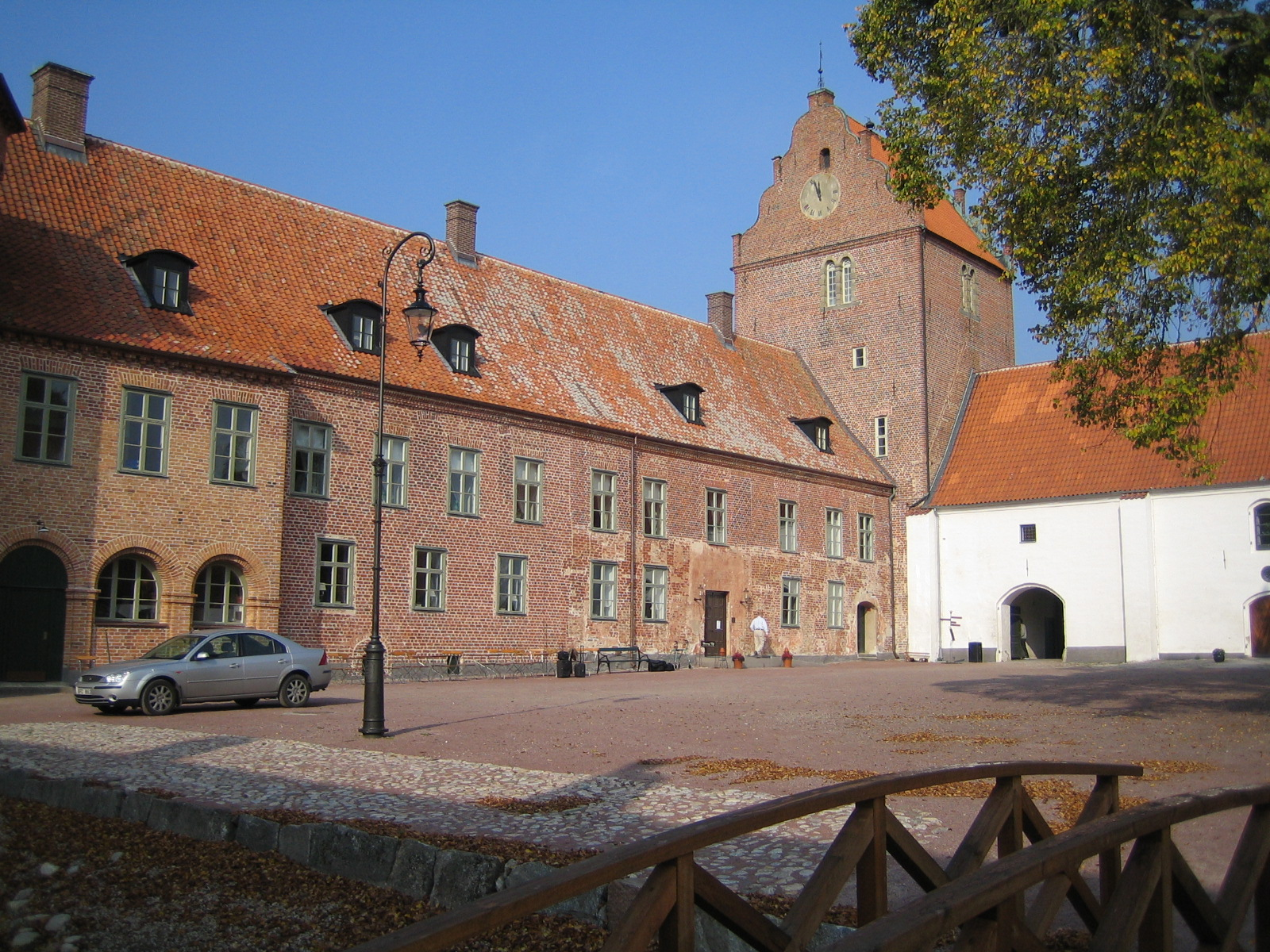
- Courtyard

Site information
- Type: Castle
- Open to the public: Yes

Location
- Scania Sweden
- Location within Skåne
- Coordinates: 56.085278°N 14.348222°E

Site history
- Built: 1270

Bäckaskog Castle (Swedish: Bäckaskog slott) in Kristianstad Municipality, Scania, southern Sweden, was originally a monastery built in the 13th century. It was transformed into a castle in the 16th century. The castle is located on the isthmus between Ivö Lake (Scania's largest lake) and Oppmanna Lake.

The monastery was closed down by the Danish Crown in 1537 during the Reformation. In 1584–1653, the noblemen Henrik Ramel and his son Henrik Ramel Junior gave the castle its present appearance.
