= Alexander Sauerweid =

Baltic German painter (1783–1844)

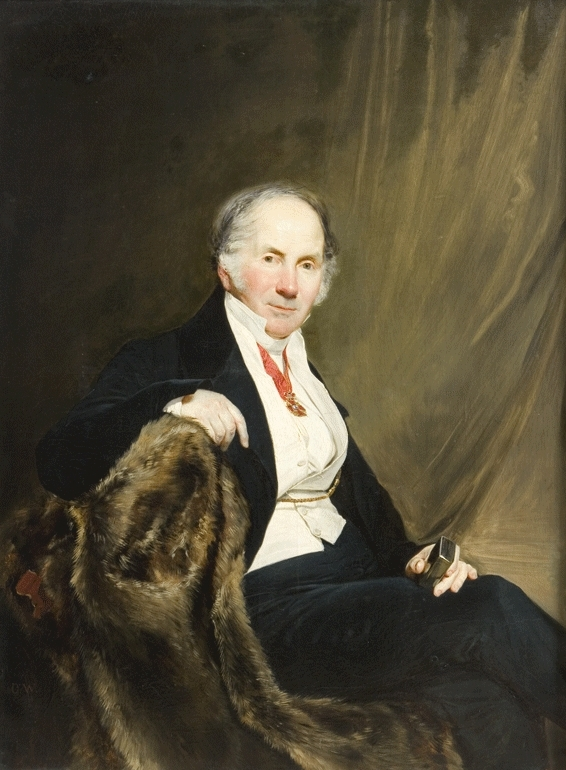
- Portrait by Bogdan Willewalde, 1840s, oils; Museum of the Academy of Arts, St. Petersburg
- Born: February 19, 1783; Duchy of Courland and Semigallia
- Died: October 25, 1844 (aged 61); Saint Petersburg
- Resting place: Volkovo Cemetery, St. Petersburg
- Education: Dresden Academy of Fine Arts
- Known for: Painting
- Elected: Professor by rank (1836)

Gottlob Alexander Sauerweid (Russian: Александр Иванович Зауервейд; 19 February 1783 – 25 October 1844) was a Baltic German painter who taught battle painting at the St. Petersburg Imperial Academy of Arts.

== Biography ==
In 1795, when Courland was annexed by Russia, his family moved to Germany where he received his artistic training at the Dresden Academy of Fine Arts from 1806 to 1812. As a young man, he enjoyed some popularity and produced a series of horse portraits, commissioned by Napoleon. He later went to Paris, travelling most of the way on foot for lack of funds, then to London, where his talent for painting battle scenes was recognized. In 1814, Czar Alexander I invited him to Saint Petersburg to paint official portraits of Russian troops and their uniforms. In 1825, he became the first Painter of the General Staff.

In 1827, he was named an honorary member of the Imperial Academy and soon became head of the battle painting class. Later he was elevated to full Professor. Under Czar Nicholas I, he was Art Instructor for the Grand Dukes Konstantin, Nicholas and Michael.

Most of his paintings were displayed in the Imperial Palaces, rather than in exhibitions. The majority are still there. His sense of perspective has been criticized, but his horses are considered to be particularly well done. In addition to oil paintings, he left behind many watercolors, etchings and drawings in pen. His son Nikolay also became a painter of military scenes.

== Works ==
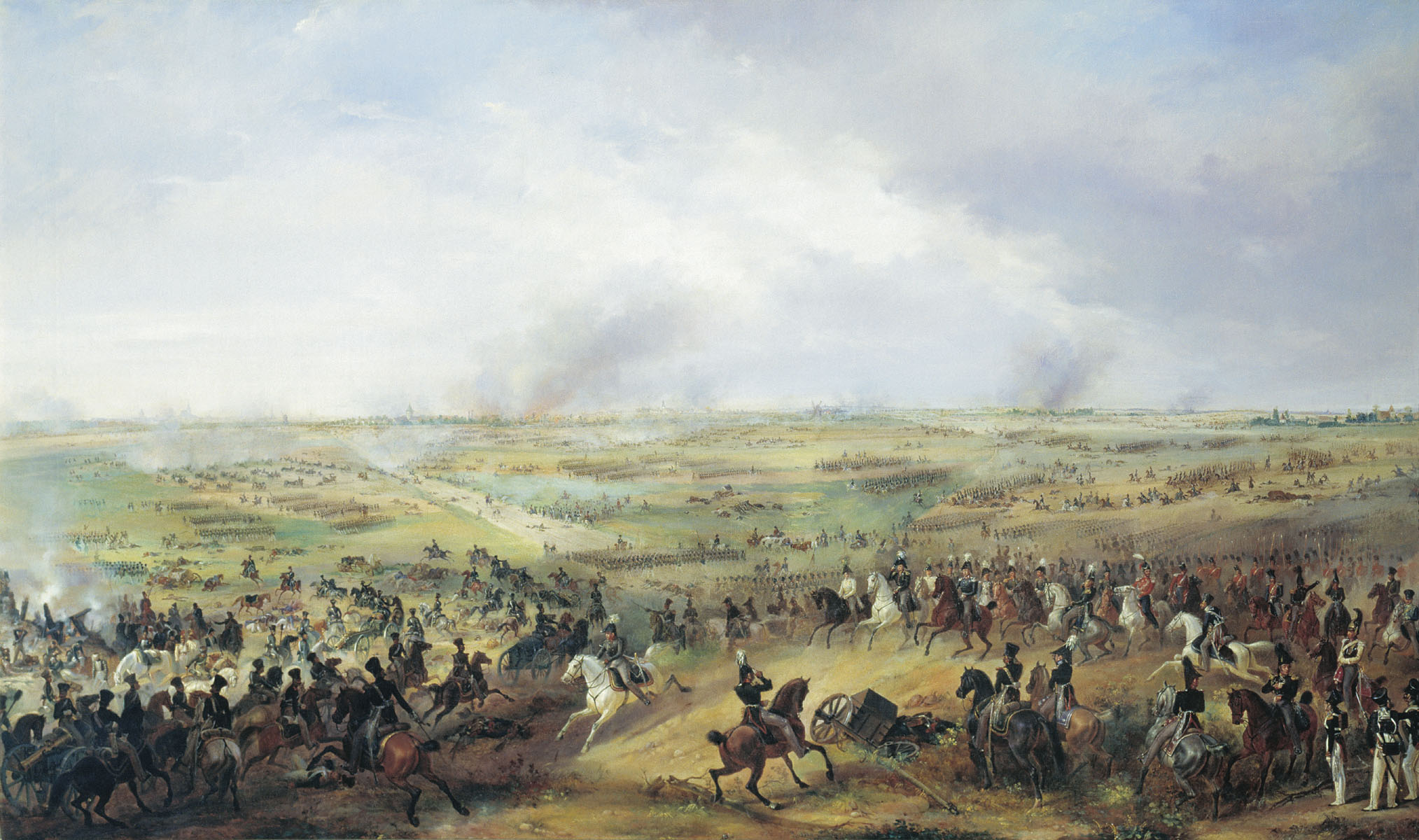
Battle of Leipzig

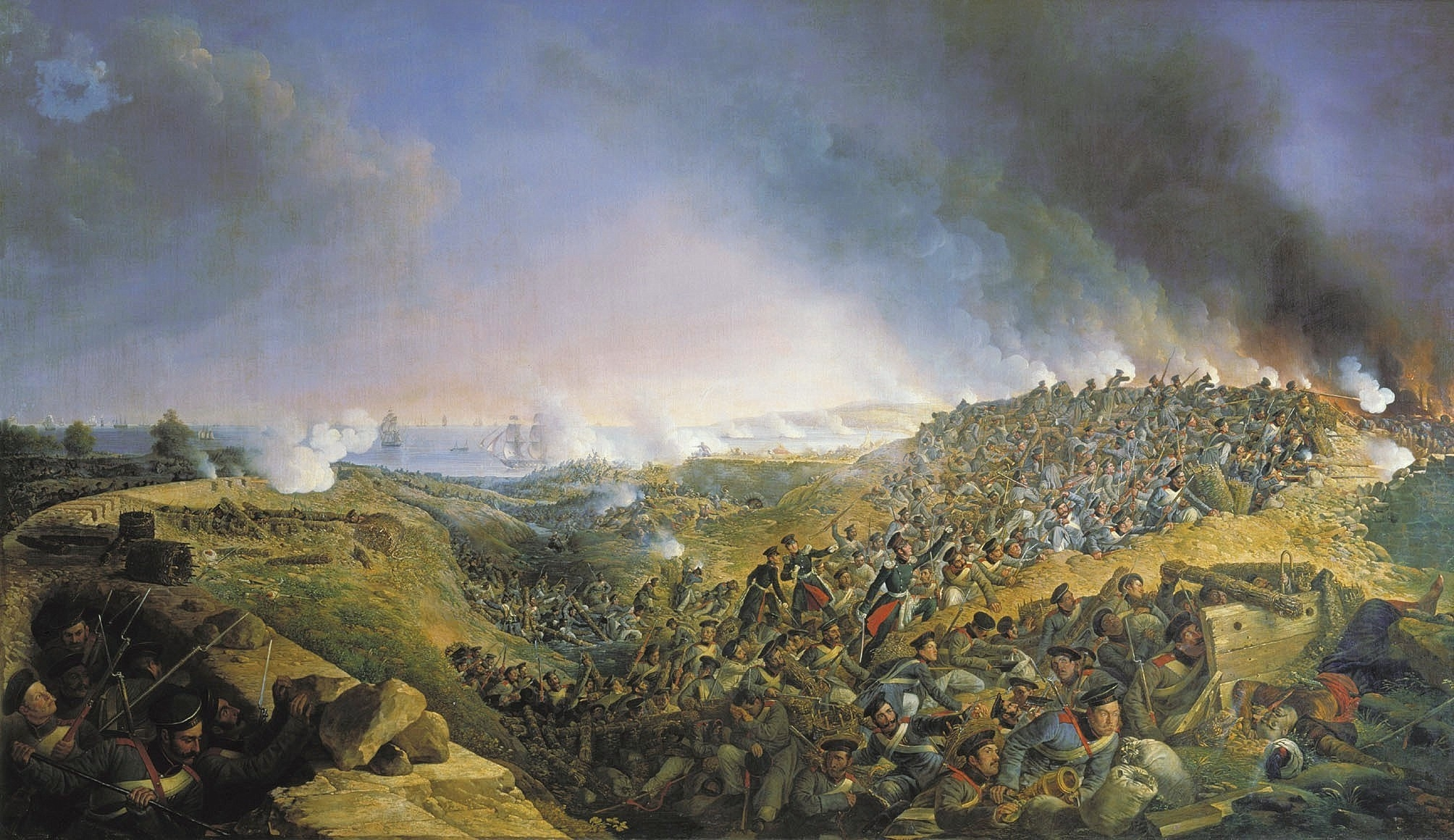
The Siege of Varna (1836)
