= Siege of Narva (1704) =

1704 siege during the Great Northern War

- Part of the Great Northern War
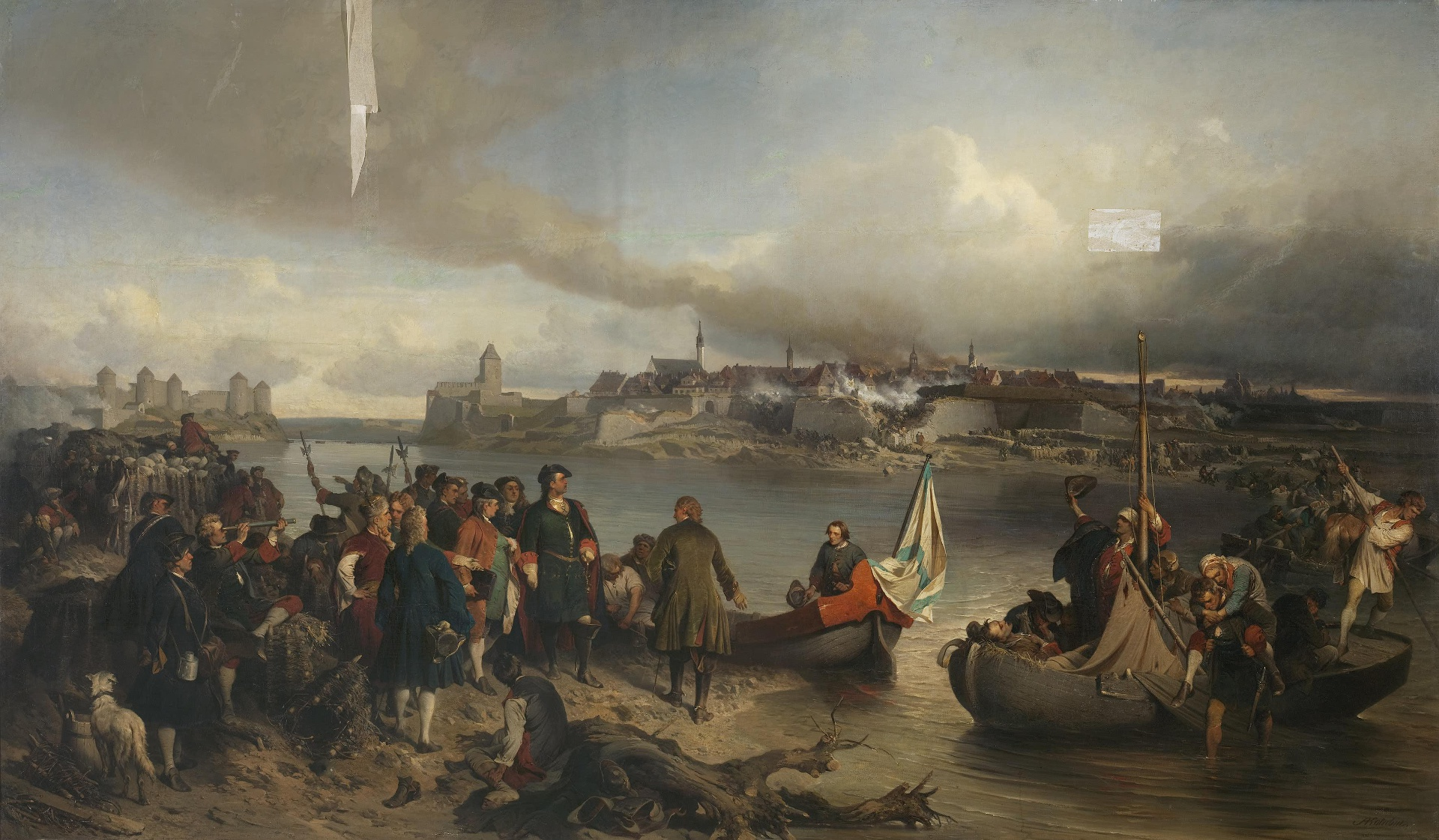
- Taking of Narva by Alexander Kotzebue
| Date | N.S. 8 July – 20 August, 1704 |
| Location | Narva, Swedish Empire (present-day Estonia) 59°22′45″N 28°12′02″E |
| Result | Russian victory |

Belligerents
| Swedish Empire | Tsardom of Russia |

Commanders and leaders
| Henning Rudolf Horn (POW) | Peter I Georg von Ogilvy |

Strength
| 3,800 infantry and 1,300 cavalry | 45,000 |

Casualties and losses
| 3,200 dead or wounded and 1,900 captured | Up to 3,000 dead or wounded |

The siege of Narva (Russian: Осада Нарвы, Swedish: Belägringen av Narva), also known as the second battle of Narva, was the second Russian siege of Swedish Narva during the Great Northern War from 8 July to 20 August 1704. (Note: O.S. 27 June – 9 August; S.C. 28 June – 10 August)

== Siege ==
The siege came four years after the first battle of Narva, where the Russians were defeated by a much smaller Swedish force defending the city. Tsar Peter I marched to the area again with a reorganized army in an attempt to capture Narva and occupy Swedish Ingria, previously a Swedish logistical center and territory ceded by Russia in 1617.

Marshal Boris Sheremetev's force of 20,000 captured Tartu on 24 June and then Russian forces led by Georg Benedikt von Ogilvy besieged Narva, with the garrison under the Commandant Major-General Henning Rudolf Horn af Ranzien and consisting of only 3,800 infantry and 1,300 cavalry.

After a long siege followed by a three-fronted attack, the Russians captured Narva on 20 August 1704, massacring hundreds of its Swedish garrison and inhabitants before Peter I stopped them. General Horn, several officers and many Swedish soldiers were captured, after roughly 3,200 casualties in the siege and aftermath. The Russians lost up to 3,000 men in total, with some estimates being over 10,000.

In August, Peter I signed the Treaty of Narva in the town, aligning the Sandomierz Confederation faction of the Polish–Lithuanian Commonwealth with Russia against Sweden in the war.

On 11 September, the surviving citizens of Narva swore allegiance to Peter I in the courtyard of the town hall, and the city was incorporated into the Russian Tsardom.

== See also ==
- Lovisa von Burghausen
- Brigitta Scherzenfeldt
- Anna Ivanovna Kramer
