= Nikolay Sauerweid =

Russian painter (1836–1866)

- Николай Зауервейд
- Born: 1836; Saint Petersburg, Russia
- Died: May 29, 1866 (aged 29–30); Saint Petersburg, Russia
- Education: Member Academy of Arts (1860)
- Alma mater: Imperial Academy of Arts
- Known for: Painting
- Father: Alexander Sauerweid

Nikolay Alexandrovich Sauerweid (Russian: Николай Александрович Зауервейд; 1836–1866) was a Russian painter. He was the son of Alexander Sauerweid.

== Biography ==
Nikolay Sauerweid studied in the Imperial Academy of Arts in Saint Petersburg. In 1857, he received a silver medal for his paintings Frenchmen storm Swartz reduit and Cossacks kidnap a French sentry in moonlight night about the Napoleonic Wars. In 1859 he graduated with a Small Gold Medal. His graduate work was Peter I stops his maraudering soldiers after taking Narva in 1704.

In 1860 Sauerweid received the title of Academician of Battle Art for his painting Prince Repnin enters Riga after the fall of the city in July 4, 1700. The artist became interesting in Genre works painting The Modest Moving from an apartment. He also painted many watercolor illustrations to the novel Prince Serebryany by A. K. Tolstoy.

In 1866 at the age of 30 Nikolay Sauerweid died.

== Works ==
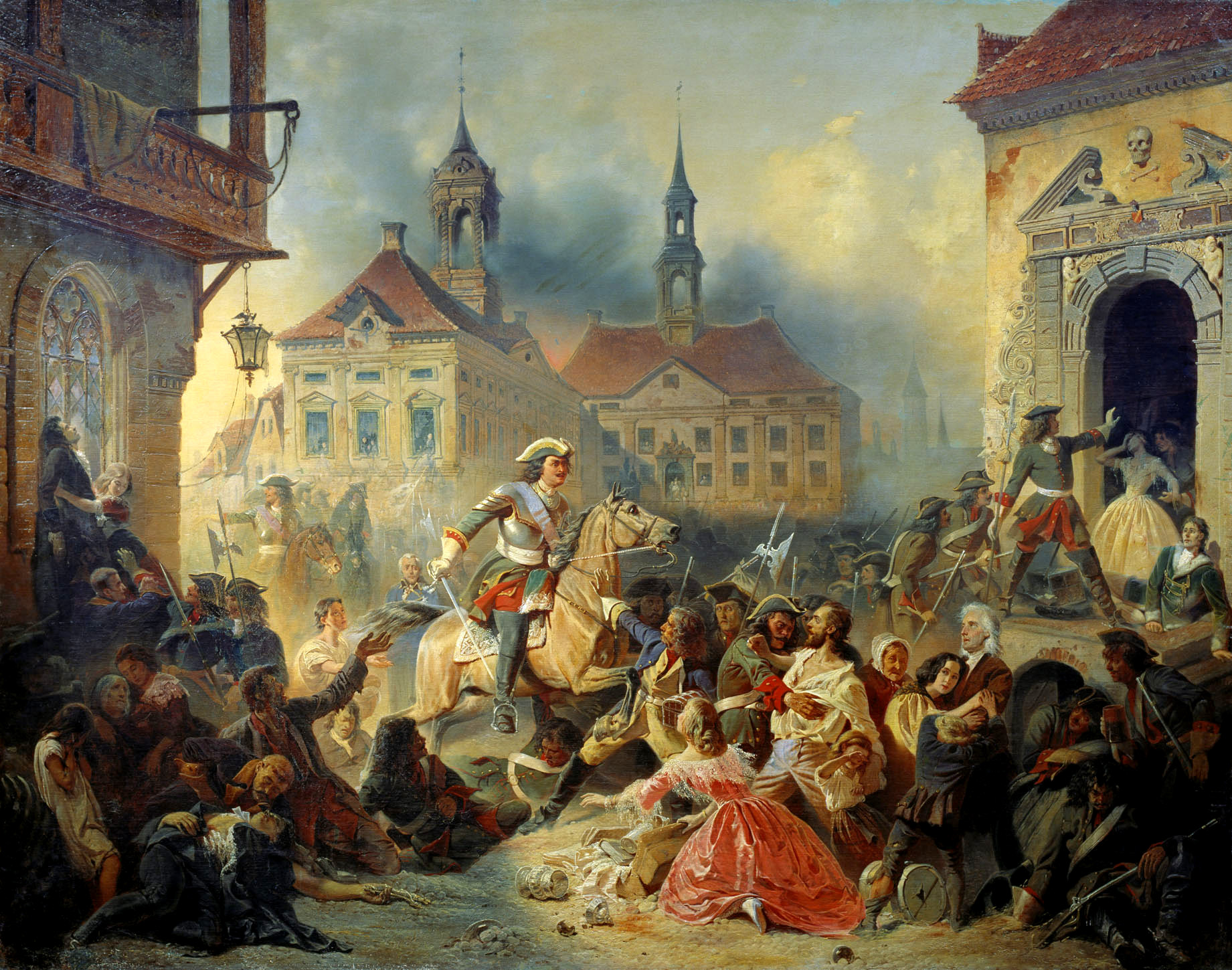
Peter I stops his marauding soldiers after taking Narva in 1704 (1859)

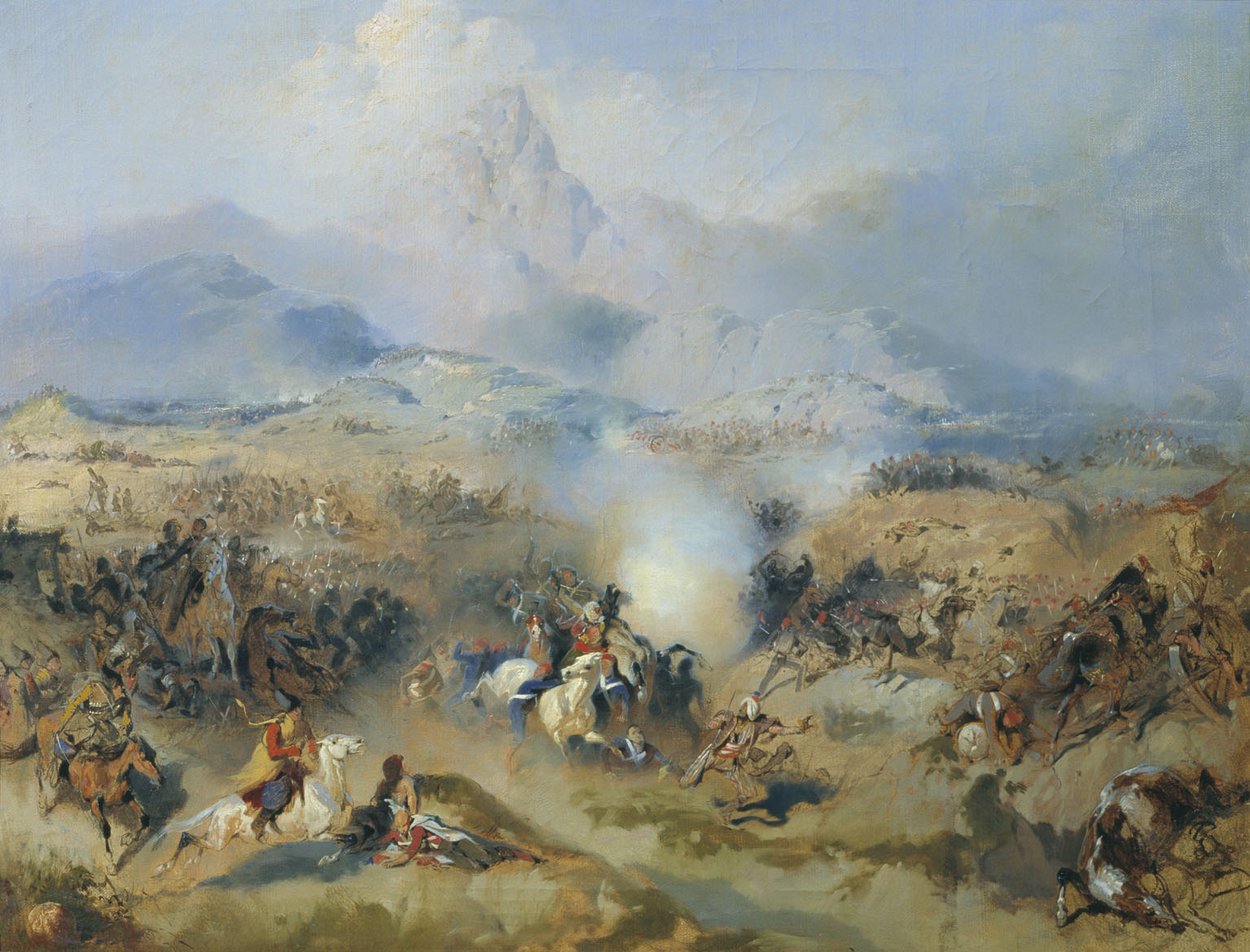
Cavalry Attack
