= Swedish invasion of Poland (1701–1706) =

18th-century Swedish invasion of Poland

- Part of the Great Northern War
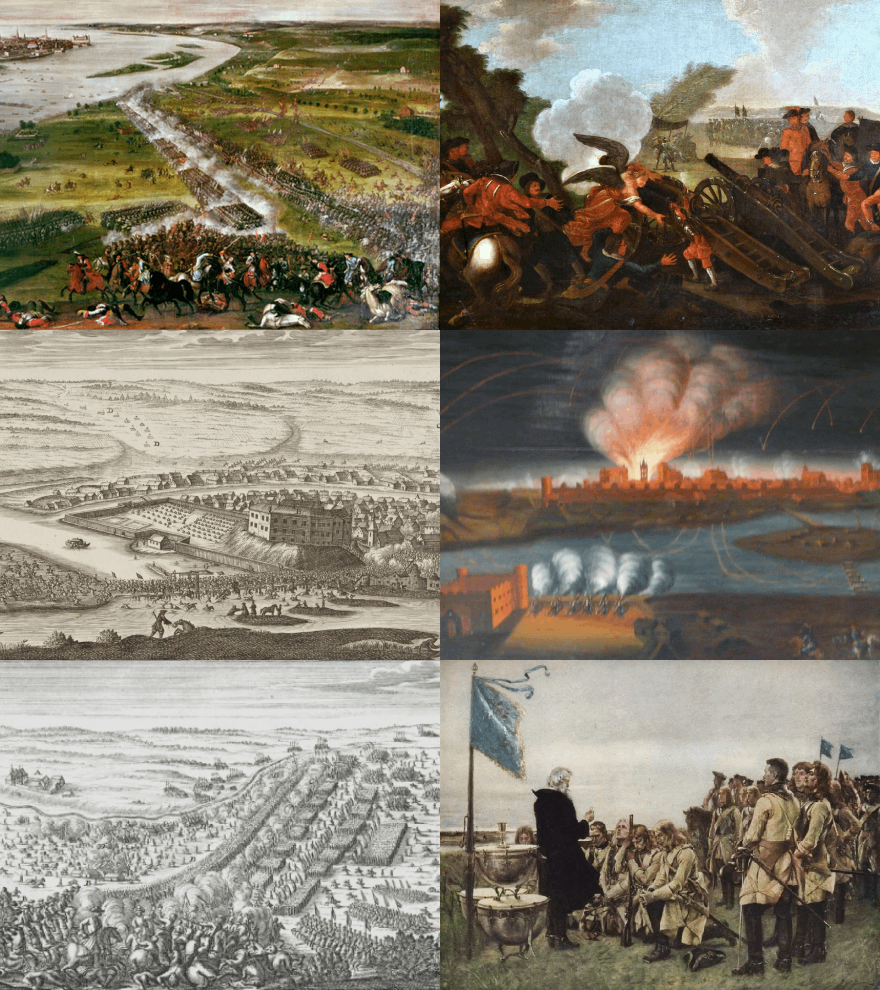
- Swedish_invasion_of_Poland_(1701–1706)_Collage Click an image to load the appropriate article Clockwise, from top left: Düna; Kliszów; Pułtusk; Thorn; Gemauerthof; Fraustadt
Date	1701–1706
Location	Polish–Lithuanian Commonwealth
Result	Swedish-led victory
Territorial changes	Stanislaw I replaces Augustus II as King of Poland

Belligerents
Swedish Empire; Warsaw Confederation	Saxony; Sandomierz Confederation; Russia; Cossack Hetmanate

Commanders and leaders
Charles XII; Arvid Horn; Carl Gustav Rehnskiöld; Magnus Stenbock; Adam Ludwig Lewenhaupt; Frederick IV †; Duke Charles; Stanisław I Leszczyński; Józef Potocki	Augustus II; Heinrich Flemming; Otto Arnold von Paykull (POW) (executed); Matthias Schulenburg; Peter I Aleksandr Menshikov; Boris Sheremetev; Ivan Mazepa; Ayuka Khan

Strength
1701: 24,000 men 1705: 40,000 men	1701: 38,000 men 1705: 120,000 men

Casualties and losses
14,785 combat casualties	70,824 combat casualties

The Swedish invasion of Poland (1701–1706), also known as Charles XII's invasion of Poland or the Polish front of the Great Northern War, was a conflict in eastern Europe overshadowed by the ongoing Great Northern War fought between Sweden, on the one side, and Russia, Denmark-Norway, Saxony and the Polish–Lithuanian Commonwealth on the other side. The Polish front was a major part of the greater conflict, and it included some decisive battles in favor of the Swedes that contributed to the length of the war (21 years).

== Background ==
Augustus the Strong had won the Polish crown by military force after a violent election. Among his opponents were the primates of Poland, most notably cardinal Michał Stefan Radziejowski, archbishop of Gniezno, as well as the powerful Sapieha family. Although these factions had promised not to work against Augustus, the agreement was very unstable. To increase his own authority and put down any rebellious elements within his country, the elected monarch considered an invasion of Swedish Livonia to be the best choice: not only would this restore a part of Poland's former territorial conquests, but it would also put down the Swedish Empire's ability to interfere with Polish affairs. With promised support from tsar Peter in Russia, and Sweden's ongoing conflict with Denmark-Norway in the west, the Polish monarch believed it was going to be an easy victory. This was opposed by the nobility, however, and his ambitions were not well received among any of his advisors, who pointed out that Poland–Lithuania was not allied with Denmark nor Russia in the Swedish conflict. Simultaneously, Charles XII announced his intentions to maintain peace with the Polish–Lithuanian Commonwealth, but that such a thing would hardly be possible as long as Augustus remained on the throne. Accordingly, the Swedish leadership issued a declaration of war against Augustus personally, but not against his nation, and Charles XII began to rally the Polish nobility against their king.

Without making the abdication of Augustus II an absolute condition, Charles XII did put all his efforts into reaching this goal. The Swedish ambition was to create a powerful Polish government that would be able to maintain independence from Sweden's enemies, as well as cooperate with Sweden against those nations. However, the pro-Swedish nobility could do little to overthrow Augustus, who received support in many forms from the Russian Empire, and by 1701 Poland–Lithuania was on the brink of civil war.

== Invasion ==
After forcing a peace treaty with Denmark and annihilating the Russian army at Narva, Charles XII's plan was to beat the Saxon army; a necessity for the Swedish army to march for Pskov and Moscow and strike the final blow against Russia. The two forces collided on the ninth of July (Swedish calendar) of 1701 near the Swedish city of Riga. The Saxons had entrenched themselves with heavy artillery support south of the river Düna, but when the Swedes attacked their casualties were limited to 100 men dead, due to the poor accuracy of the enemy artillery and the water that negated explosive shells. The Saxon lines collapsed as soon as the Swedish army landed on the river bank, and up to 2,000 of Augustus' soldiers were killed. However, the Saxon army and their Russian reinforcements managed to retreat and maintain a sizeable force near the Swedish border. Charles XII was now forced to choose between marching into Poland and be attacked from behind by the Russians or the other way around. He chose the former, and thus the invasion of Poland had begun.

After crushing his enemies once more in the battle of Kliszów, Charles XII considered a quick strike into Saxony to destroy the center of Augustus' government (Poland–Lithuania and Saxony were in a personal union at this time, and the Polish government was located in Saxony). However, he rejected this idea, partly because the naval powers of Europe had claimed that such an operation into the Holy Roman Empire would benefit the French king Louis XIV, who was at war with Leopold I in the War of the Spanish Succession. Another important factor to why the campaign was abandoned was Charles XII's intention to create a public opposition against Augustus in Poland, which would be difficult if the people were victims of a Swedish invasion. Because of this, Charles XII's upcoming campaigns would be aimed at destroying the Polish military in the field while avoiding sieges or skirmishes. Only by crushing the Polish-Lithuanian army, Charles XII thought he would be able to turn the Polish people against Augustus.

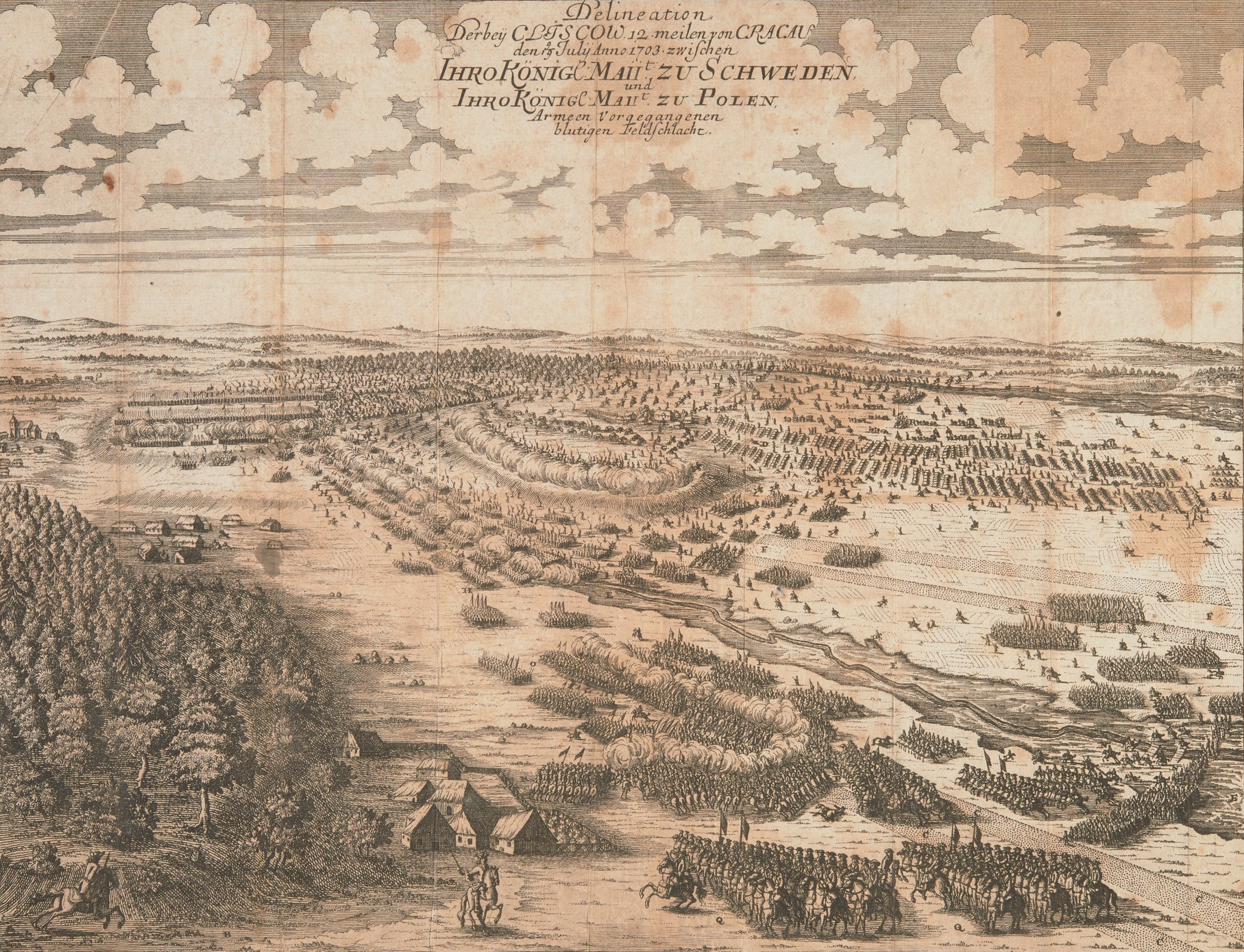
Battle of Kliszów

The king let his troops rest near Kraków, where he broke his thigh bone in a riding accident (a wound that would affect him for the rest of his life). Meanwhile, Augustus had tried to gather his supporters to create a confederation and use military force to keep Greater Poland down, after which he tried to strengthen diplomatic ties with Frederick I of Prussia. However, his plans were ruined when Charles XII routed the Saxon army at Pułtusk and took the city of Toruń after a quick siege.

With his threatening position near Prussia's borders, Charles XII convinced Frederick to sign a non-aggression pact with the Swedish empire (something that would be violated by Frederick in 1715, when Prussia attacked Swedish settlements in northern Germany). Augustus once more tried to gather supporters in Lublin, but the parliament of Poland was divided when the officials of Greater Poland refused to accept Augustus as their king.

== Stanisław Leszczyński ==
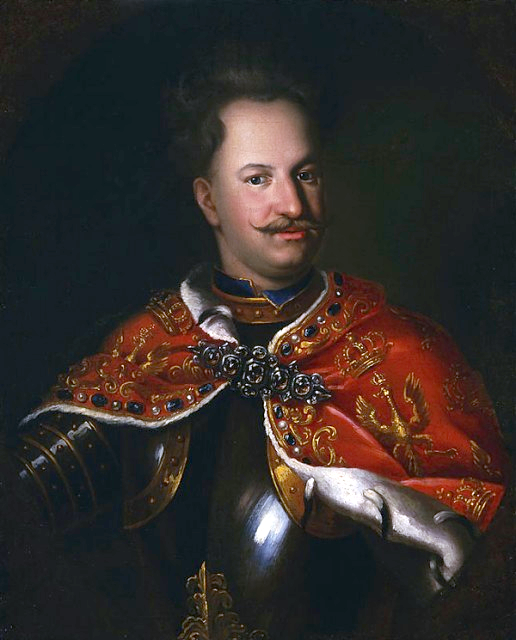
Stanisław I Leszczyński as king of Poland, being elected in 1704

The voivode of Poznań, Stanisław Leszczyński, organized a confederation in Greater Poland in protest against Augustus' actions. The confederation eventually won many supporters, many of whom feared a Russian invasion and believed Swedish protection to be the only way to defend themselves. Even cardinal Radziejowski, who had previously spoken of the importance of neutrality, now claimed that an alliance with the Swedes was necessary for Poland's survival.

A confederation in Warsaw between January and February 1704 declared that king Augustus was no longer king of Poland, and a new election took place. However, before the election could begin, the leading candidate for the Polish throne, Jakub Ludwik Sobieski, was imprisoned by Augustus' forces and would remain in jail for two years along with his brother, Konstanty. Yet the king's efforts were in vain, and under the protection of the Swedish military the council members in Greater Poland could safely elect Stanisław Leszczyński as king of Poland–Lithuania on 2 July 1704. His royal title would be Stanisław I (the surname Leszczyński would still remain in use).

Charles XII now decided to aim a decisive strike against the regions supportive of Augustus, namely Lesser Poland, but while Charles XII was besieging Lwów, Augustus moved his forces north to unite with the recently arrived Saxon army and attack the defenseless city of Warsaw, taking Arvid Horn prisoner. Fearing Swedish retaliation, Augustus then moved west in an evasive maneuver, taking his cavalry forces towards Kraków to lure the Swedes south while the main army led by Schulenburg would lead the grand army back to Saxony. But Charles XII was not to be fooled and immediately chased Schulenburg to annihilate the Saxon grand army. After an extraordinary march (500 km in nine days), the Swedish troops caught up with the retreating Saxons at Poniec, near the border of Silesia. In a forced battle on 28 October 1704, Charles XII ran down a certain amount of Saxon troops with his 2,300 cavalrymen, but Schulenburg's army was not completely destroyed.

During 1705 the faction supporting Stanisław and the Swedes grew considerably, and the new king could be crowned in September, and with his new authority as king Stanisław signed the treaty of Warsaw, ending the Polish-Swedish war. Under the influence of Charles XII, the treaty included that Poland would join the war against Russia and that Polish Protestants would be given certain rights to exercise their faith.

== War in Saxony ==
When the fighting between Sweden and Poland had ceased the task remained for Charles XII to secure the new order against coup attempts from the Saxons and Augustus' ally tsar Peter. Throughout the time of the war Peter had been desperately trying to modernize his outdated army after the defeat at Narva, even though the Russian military was adequate to operate against poorly defended cities throughout the Swedish Baltic provinces. After Wolmar von Schlippenbach's failures in the battles of Erastfer and Hummelshof, the Russians had conquered Nöteborg and Nyenskans, as well as beginning the construction of Petersburg, which would become their first naval base in the Baltic sea. Throughout 1704 Dorpat and Narva had also been lost. However, the Russians had failed to drive the Swedes out of Courland, and thus the Swedes remained in control of the eastern Baltic sea and were able to maintain a steady supply of resources to the army in Poland. This has been credited to Adam Ludwig Lewenhaupt for his victories at Jakobstadt and Gemauerthof.

To gain an advantage in the Great Northern War, Peter was eager to strengthen the power of Augustus in Poland. For this purpose he had sent a large force to the area and in the autumn of 1705 he personally met with Augustus in Grodno to negotiate about what actions should be taken. While Carl Gustaf Rehnskiöld protected western Poland, Charles XII rapidly led his men towards Grodno around new year 1706 hoping to capture Augustus, who was protected by a Russian task force under field marshal Georg Benedict Ogilvy. Augustus had heard of the Swedish advance and quickly escaped the city along with a large cavalry force and then tried to attack Rehnskiöld's army together with a Russian-Saxon army under Matthias von der Schulenburg. However, Rehnskiöld's excellent tactics and relentless offensives quickly overwhelmed the numerically superior enemy in the battle of Wschowa, and of 20,000 alliance troops only a quarter managed to escape while Sweden lost as few as 400 men.

With the decisive Swedish victory the threat from Saxony was gone, and Charles XII could now concentrate on chasing the Russians out of eastern Poland. He invaded Saxony and enforced the peace of Altranstädt on 14 September 1706, in which Augustus renounced his claims to the Polish throne and recognized the leadership of Stanisław.

== Aftermath ==
At this time the Great Northern War was no longer an isolated conflict and begun to involve the great powers of western Europe as Charles's reputation as an undefeated military genius spread. Prussia, which had maintained a stance of neutrality now forged an alliance with Sweden in August 1707, possibly out of fear rather than tactical gains. Louis XIV of France also paid close attention to the conflict and reached out to Charles XII with a proposal that Sweden would join the ongoing War of Spanish Succession. For some time this was a very possible event as the Holy Roman Empire had supported Augustus in the war as well as taking in fleeing alliance troops, but France's hopes of Swedish support were lost when the English statesman John Churchill Marlborough personally visited Charles XII and pleaded for him not to intervene. The Holy Roman Emperor signed a treaty with Sweden on 22 August 1707 where he made amends to the Swedish king and agreed to give the Protestants in Silesia more religious rights. This was also a signal to non-Catholics in the rest of the Empire – particularly Hungary – that if they ever came into conflict with the catholic government then Sweden would aid them. After this the emperor was careful to take any steps against Sweden, further enhancing the image of Charles XII as a feared and powerful ruler in Europe.

The following year, Charles XII launched the invasion of Russia.

== Battles ==
Battle	Swedish numbers	Coalition numbers	Swedish casualties	Coalition casualties	Result
Düna	7,000	13,000	500	2,000	Swedish victory
Tryškiai	900	1,000–2,000	28	140	Swedish victory
Darsūniškis	240	6,000	145	Unknown	Coalition victory
Vilnius	2,500–3,000	3,000	50	100	Swedish victory
Kliszów	12,000	23,800	1,100	4,400	Swedish victory
Saločiai	1,100	6,000	167	1,500	Swedish victory
Pułtusk	3,000	3,500	58	1,200	Swedish victory
Toruń	26,000	6,000	50	5,860	Swedish victory
Jakobstadt	5,500	15,000	224	2,817	Swedish victory
Poznań	2,700	6,200	300	1,000	Swedish victory
Lemberg	1,500–2,000	600	30–40	580–590	Swedish victory
Poniec	5,200	4,100	230	500	Inconclusive
Oderbeltsch	Unknown	1,200	Unknown	1,200	Swedish victory
Tillendorf	1,500	600	Unknown	519	Swedish victory
Palanga	387	2,000–2,100	60	350	Swedish victory
Gemauerthof	7,000	13,000–20,000	1,900	5,000	Swedish victory
Warsaw	2,000	9,500	292	1,000	Swedish victory
Mitau	900	10,000	Unknown	Unknown	Coalition victory
Praga	1,000–1,500	5,000	200	250	Swedish victory
Grodno	34,000	41,000	3,000	15,000–17,000	Swedish victory
Fraustadt	9,400	20,000	1,400	14,677–15,277	Swedish victory
Valkininkai	1,000	4,600	60	290	Swedish victory
Nyasvizh	500	1,125	50	700	Swedish victory
Kletsk	1,500	4,700	31	4,070	Swedish victory
Lachowicze	1,950	1,400	Unknown	1,361	Swedish victory
Piertkova	Unknown	Unknown	600	Unknown	Coalition victory
Kalisz	14,000	30,000	4,900	3,000	Coalition victory

== Sources ==
- Brunner, Ernst (2016), Carolus Rex: Karl XII – hans liv i sanning återberättat (in Swedish), Stockholm: Albert Bonniers Förlag, ISBN 9789100160982
- Carlson, Fredrik (1885), Sveriges Historia under Carl den Tolftes Regering (in Swedish), Stockholm: P.A. Norstedt & Söner, OCLC 881561260
- Defoe, Daniel (1720), The History of the Wars, of His Late Majesty Charles XII, King of Sweden, Sweden: H. P.
- Fryxell, Anders (1861), Berättelser ur svenska historien (in Swedish), vol. 21–22
- Ghelen, Giov. van (1702), Avvisi italiani, ordinarii e straordinarii, Volume 19 (in Italian), Vienna
- Grimberg & Uddgren, Carl & Hugo (1914). Svenska krigarbragder (in Swedish). Norstedt Förlag. Stockholm.
- Kling, Steve; Sjöström, Oskar (2015), Great Northern War Compendium (Volume One), St. Louis: THGC Publishing, ISBN 978-0-9964557-0-1
- Kuvaja, Christer, Krigen kring Östersjön - Karolinska krigare 1660-1721, Schildts Förlags AB, Helsingfors 2008
- Larsson, Olle (2009), Stormaktens sista krig (in Swedish), Lund: Historiska Media, ISBN 978-91-85873-59-3
- Nordberg, Jöran (1740), Konung Carl den XII:tes historia, Stockholm: Directeuren Pet. Momma
- Phillips, John (1705), The Present State of Europe, or, The Historical and Political Mercury, Volume 16, London: Randal Taylor, 1690-, OCLC 79556490
- Kapustnik, Yuri (2009). История великой северной войны [History of Great Northern War] (in Russian). Ориана. ISBN 978-966-8250-71-2.
- Pönitz, Karl (1858), Karl XII betraktad från krigsvetenskaplig synpunkt (in Swedish), N.M. Lindhus Boktryckeri
- Rosen, Carl (1936), Bidrag till kännedom om de händelser, som närmast föregingo svenska stormaktsväldets fall, volume I, Stockholm: P.A. Norstedt & Söner
- Sjöström, Oskar (2008), Fraustadt 1706. Ett fält färgat rött (in Swedish), Lund: Historiska Media
- Sliesoriūnas, Gintautas (2009). "The First Occupation of Vilnius during the Great Northern War (April–May 1702)". Lithuanian Historical Studies. 14: 71–104. doi:10.30965/25386565-01401006. ISSN 1392-2343.
- Sundberg, Ulf, Sveriges krig 1630-1814 (2010) Svenskt Militärhistoriskt Bibliotek.
- Svensson, Axel, Karl XII som fältherre, Svenskt Militärhistoriskt Bibliotek, Stockholm 2001
- Wimmer, Jan (1956). Wojsko Rzeczypospolitej w dobie wojny północnej: 1700–1717.
- Wolke, Lars Ericson (2003), Svenska Slagfält, Wahlström & Widstrand, ISBN 91-46-20225-0
- Ullgren, Peter (2008), Det stora nordiska kriget 1700-1721, Stockholm: Prisma, ISBN 978-91-518-5107-5
- Unknown (1704), Kort berättelse, om det i Pohlen öfwerståndne fälttoget åhr 1704
