= Battle of Grodno (1706) =

Battle during the Great Northern War

- Part of the Great Northern War and the Campaign of Grodno
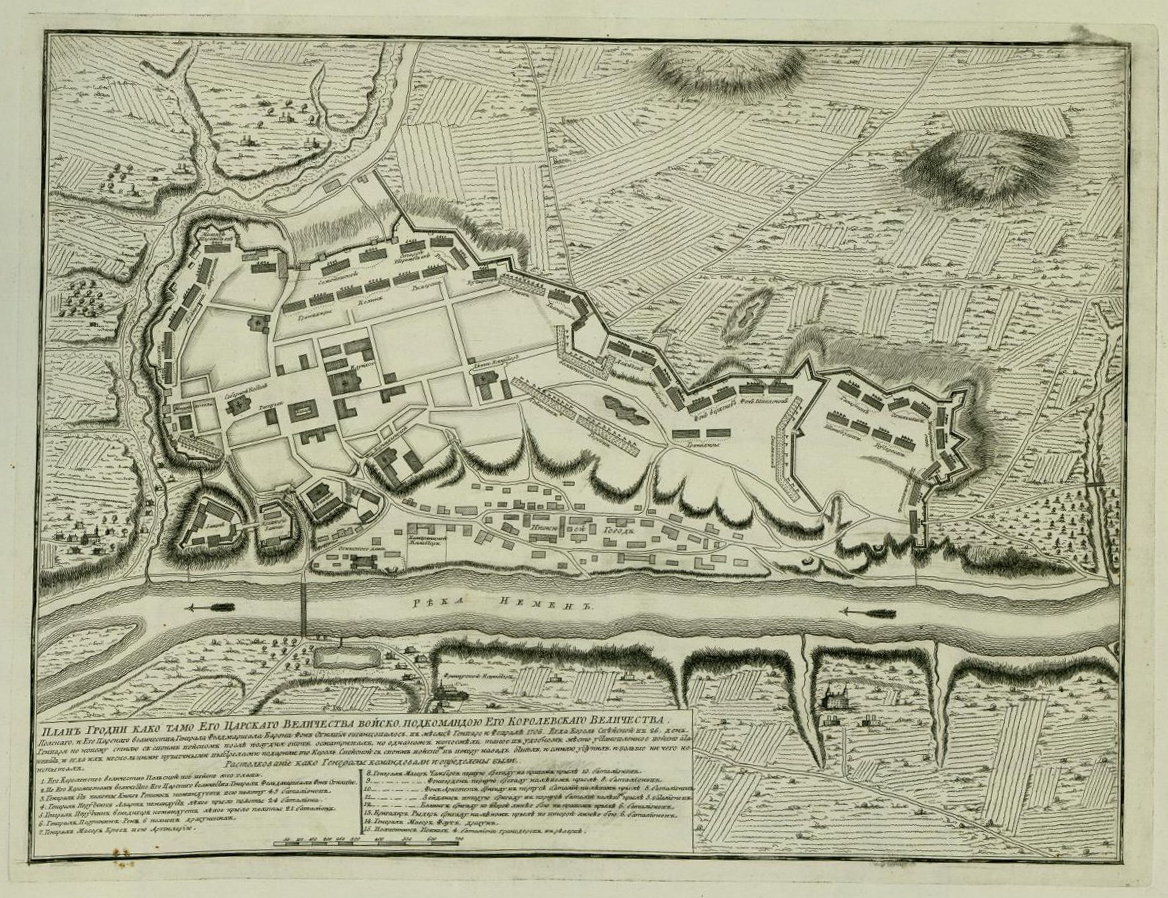
- Grodno and its fortifications on a 1706 plan
Date	15 January – 30 March 1706 (O.S.); 16 January – 31 March 1706 (Swedish calendar); 26 January — 10 April 1706 (N.S.)
Location	Grodno, present-day Belarus
Result	Swedish victory

Belligerents
Swedish Empire	Tsardom of Russia

Commanders and leaders
(Swedish Empire) Charles XII	(Tsardom of Russia) Ogilvy (Electorate of Saxony) Augustus II (Tsardom of Russia) Anikita Repnin (Tsardom of Russia) Aleksandr Danilovich Menshikov

Strength
34,000: 24,000 Swedish; 10,000 Polish	41,000: 36,000 Russian; 5,000 Saxon

Casualties and losses
3,000: of which only 100 killed in actual combat, the majority perished due to frostbite and exhaustion	15,000–17,000: 8,000 during the blockade 7,000–9,000 during the retreat, the majority due to starvation, sickness and exhaustion

The Battle of Grodno (1706) was a siege in early 1706 during the Great Northern War. Grodno (Hrodna) was a city of the Polish–Lithuanian Commonwealth at this time.

== Background ==
At the beginning of the Swedish invasion of Poland (1701–1706), Western Poland, Lithuania (including Vilnius and Grodno) and Courland (including Mitau) fell in the hands of the pro-Swedish Warsaw Confederation (formed in 1704), while Eastern Poland, Ukraine and Belarus initially fell under the control of the pro-Russian Sandomierz Confederation. Meanwhile, the aftermath of the Lithuanian Civil War (1697–1702) was still going on, with the now pro-Swedish Jan Kazimierz Sapieha defeating the now pro-Russian Ogińskis in the Battle of Druja (20 June 1704). By autumn 1704, the Russian army was directly intervening in the internal conflicts of the Commonwealth, invading Lithuania and participating in the Battle of Skuodas (12 November 1704 N.S.), defeating the Swedish-Sapieha coalition. In December 1704, Russian troops occupied Minsk and Grodno, with most of Belarus following thereafter.

In the first half of 1705, the anti-Swedish coalition (with their main camp in Brest-Litovsk) was planning how to defeat Charles XII of Sweden in the field. The main plan was to lure Charles to Grodno and trap him there. In early July 1705, the Campaign of Grodno was launched, with Peter I entering Vilnius on 19 July 1705. However, the coalition was defeated near Warsaw on 31 July, and failed to disrupt the coronation of Stanisław Leszczyński on 4 October. Meanwhile, Anikita Repnin launched a campaign to occupy all of Courland, winning the Siege of Mitau (25 August 1705 – 15 September 1705 N.S.). The Battle of Praga on 25 October brought yet another Swedish victory. The plan to trap Charles at Grodno could still succeed, however, as his army approached the city walls in late January 1706.

== Siege ==
Between 26 January and 10 April 1706 (N.S.), Grondo was subjected to a tight blockade by the joint Swedish–Polish army (21,000 Swedes, 10,000 Poles; 3,000 Swedes had already died due to frostbite prior to the arrival). In the city and close vicinity, there were about 41,000 Russian and Saxon troops under the command of General Field-Marshal Ogilvy as well as general Repnin. On 13 January 1706, the Swedish army coming from Poland crossed the Neman River and squeezed out the Russian cavalry units of Menshikov towards Minsk, cutting of all connections to Russia for the Grodno garrison. The situation of the Russian troops was made even more difficult after the allied Polish-Lithuanian king Augustus II quickly left Grodno in Polish direction, taking four Russian dragoon regiments with him. As a result, the Grodno garrison was left without cavalry, which was necessary for reconnaissance and food supplies.

After putting Grodno under siege, the Swedes occupied Nyasvizh (23 March N.S.) and besieged Lyakhavichy (late March – 12 May 1706). Meanwhile, the Russian garrison of Grodno suffered great hardship from the lack of food, as well as from diseases. This took the lives of about 8,000 soldiers. After the blockade of his main troops in Grodno, Peter the Great had only 12,000 men left in Belarus. Being in Minsk with this army, he communicated with the besieged garrison via a poruchik named Yakovlev, who made his way to Grodno dressed as a Polish peasant. Besides that, the 14,000 Ukrainian Cossacks of Ivan Mazepa were ordered to constantly engage the enemy. Peter did not dare to face Charles in an open battle so far from Russia. Because of that, he ordered the Grodno garrison to hold out until spring, when the rivers would get free of ice. Then they had to retreat behind the Neman towards Brest and further to the Dnieper, what they successfully did until May 1706.

== Aftermath ==
Charles incorrectly predicted the direction of the Russian retreat, expecting them to retreat eastwards where he placed his main forces. Having discovered the surprisingly rapid Russian retreat towards southwest too late, he started the pursuit, hoping to catch up the Russians via the shortcut of the Pripyat Marshes in Polesia. However, they proved to be impassable, and Charles had to give up the pursuit of the Russians, and to seek a battle with the Saxons first.

Nevertheless, Charles had won one of his greatest victories at the Battle of Grodno, and the overall Grodno campaign, by simply cutting off his opponents' resources and supplies. Later, in a letter to his ally Frederick IV of Denmark, Peter I confirmed losses of up to 17,000 men during the encirclement and retreat from Grodno.

== See also ==
- Campaign of Grodno
- Charles XII invasion of Poland

== Sources ==
- Ullgren, Peter (2008). Det stora nordiska kriget 1700-1721: en berättelse om stormakten Sveriges fall [The Great Northern War 1700–1721: A Story of Sweden's Fall as a Great Power] (in Swedish). Stockholm: Prisma. p. 371. ISBN 978-91-518-5107-5.
- Николай Шефов. Битвы России. Военно-историческая библиотека. М., 2002.
- Russian Army at Grodno 1706
