= Battle of Poznań =

Battle of Poznań can refer to:

- Battle of Poznań (1704)
- Battle of Poznań (1945)
