= Battle of Gemauerthof =

Battle in the Great Northern War, 1705

Coordinates: 56°26′04″N 23°31′31″E

- Part of the Great Northern War
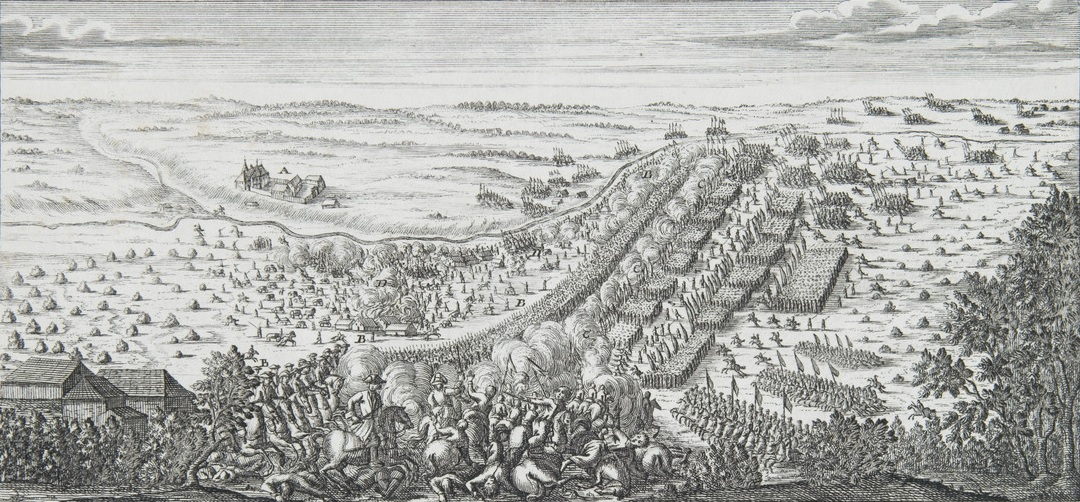
- The Battle of Gemauerthof (engraving from the Johann Christoph Brotze's collection)
| Date | 15 July 1705 (O.S.); 16 July 1705 (Swedish calendar); 26 July 1705 (N.S.) |
| Location | Gemauerthof, Duchy of Courland and Semigallia, (now Mūrmuiža, Vilce Parish, Jelgava Municipality, Latvia) |
| Result | Swedish victory |

Belligerents
| (Sweden) Swedish Empire | Tsardom of Russia |

Commanders and leaders
| (Sweden) Adam Ludwig Lewenhaupt | (Russia) Boris Sheremetev (WIA) |

Strength
| 7,000 to 8,900 (Note: 4,000 infantry; 3,000 to 4,900 cavalry); 17 regimental guns | 10,343 (Note: or 13,000) to 20,000 (Note: 3,154 to 3,600 infantry; 7,551 to 14,000 dragoon; 2,000 irregular); 16 artillery pieces |

Casualties and losses
| 1,900: 900 killed, 1,000 wounded | 2,225 to 5,000: 2,000 killed, 2,000–3,000 wounded, 400 captured |

The Battle of Gemauerthof took place during the Great Northern War, fought south of Riga near Jelgava, in present-day Latvia in July 1705. The Swedish forces under Adam Ludwig Lewenhaupt fought a Russian army under Boris Sheremetev. The Swedes were victorious, but the victory was only symbolic. In August, the Russians conquered Courland.

== Battle ==
The Swedes, exhausted after forced marching, went to camp and were cooking supper when the news came of a large Russian army with 16 artillery pieces nearby. The Swedes, who themselves had 17 artillery pieces quickly deployed into battle formation and, encouraged by General Lewenhaupt, attacked the Russians. Although suffering severe setbacks on their right flank, the assault continued. On the left, the Swedish cavalry charged and broke the Russians. The infantry in the centre fired carefully at point-blank range and then charged, pushing their foes back in disorder. The battle ended in a confused melee, which was eventually won by the Swedes. The Russian cavalry withdrew while the infantry was destroyed by a combined-arms assault.

== Aftermath ==
Field Marshal Sheremetev had received a shot in the abdomen and General Baur was wounded in the thigh. Over 5,000 Russians were killed or wounded.

When the defeated army reached Vilna, the tsar surveyed his newly formed 60,000 men. The tsar, Peter the Great, was far from reprimanding the field marshal for this defeat. He realized that it was possible to lose a battle against the Swedes despite being three times superior. And since he could raise a new army at any time, some of which were compulsorily recruited farmers and Livonian expellees, he knew that the campaign against the Swedes could be won.

Peter the Great called this defeat a "minor misfortune" of no great significance, even in his diaries he mentions the battle only in passing. He hid the real losses from his own troops and marched with his newly formed army towards Livonia to finally defeat the Swedes. The losses of the Swedes were given as 900 dead and over 1,000 wounded.

In addition, several high-ranking officers were killed or seriously wounded in action. Therefore it was not possible for the Swedes to pursue the Russian army.

== See also ==
- Campaign of Grodno

== Sources ==
- Alf Åberg & Göte Göransson "Karoliner" p. 114 - 115
- Velikanov, Vladimir; Mekhneev, Sergei (2014). Курляндский поход Шереметева и «упущенная виктория» при Мур-музе (Гемауэргофе) 26 июля 1705 г [Sheremetev's Courland campaign and the "missed Victoria" at the Murmuiza (Gemauerthof) on July 26, 1705]. Старый Цейхгауз (in Russian): 70–80.
