= Adam Ludwig Lewenhaupt =

Swedish general (1659–1719)

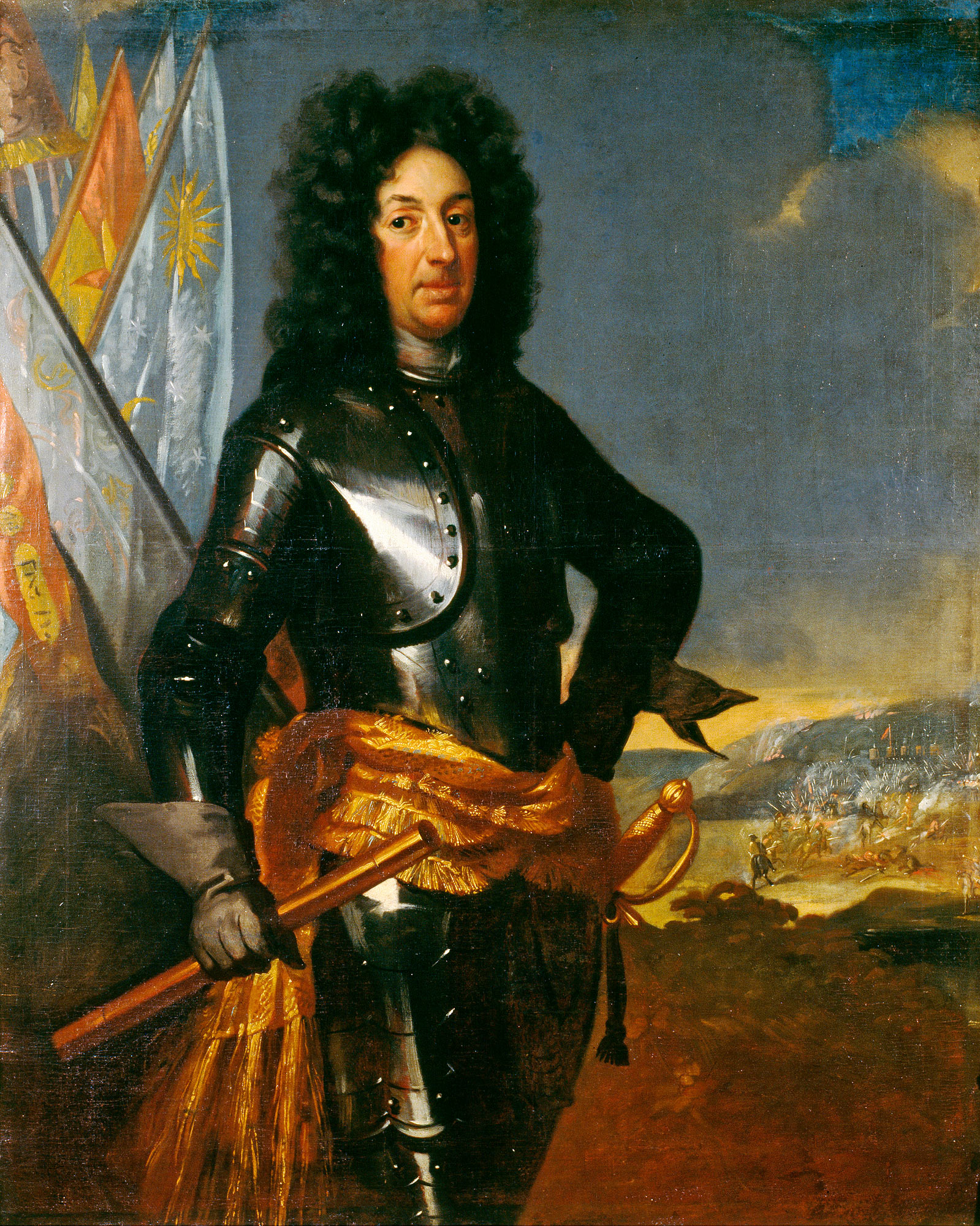
- Portrait by David von Krafft
- Born: 15 April 1659; Copenhagen, Denmark
- Died: 12 February 1719 (aged 59) Moscow, Russia
- Allegiance: Holy Roman Empire; Sweden
- Branch: Holy Roman Army; Dutch Army; Swedish Army
- Rank: General
- Conflicts: Great Turkish War; Siege of Buda; Siege of Érsekújvár; Nine Years' War; Great Northern War; Battle of Saladen; Battle of Jakobstadt; Battle of Gemauerthof; Battle of Lesnaya; Battle of Poltava; Surrender at Perevolochna

Adam Ludwig Lewenhaupt (15 April 1659 – 12 February 1719) was a Swedish general, best known for his participation in the Great Northern War.

== Biography ==
He was born on 15 April 1659 in a Swedish fortified camp near Copenhagen. He attended Lund University, Rostock, Wittenberg and Uppsala, he originally pursued a career in the diplomatic arena, but found this occupation quite undesirable. He then became a soldier, served in the Austrian Army against the Turks, and later in the Dutch Army under William III in Holland. He returned to Sweden in 1697. When the Great Northern War broke out, he was placed in command of a newly created regiment of infantry. He was one of the few successful commanders against the Russians in the Baltic region while King Charles XII was on campaign in Poland and Saxony. In 1705, Lewenhaupt won the battle of Gemauerthof and was appointed Governor of Riga. In 1708, he was ordered to march east with a supply column, to support Charles's primary invasion force in Russia. This led to the battle of Lesnaya (1708), in which he was defeated and forced to abandon his supplies. In 1709, after having connected with the King's army, Lewenhaupt was given command of the infantry at the disastrous battle of Poltava (1709) and the surrender at Perevolochna. He was kept a prisoner in Russia, and he lived in Moscow until his death on 12 February 1719.

== Legacy ==
His memoirs, edited by his son-in-law, were published at Stockholm in 1757.
