= Battle of Praga (1705) =

Battle in the Great Northern War

- Part of the Great Northern War
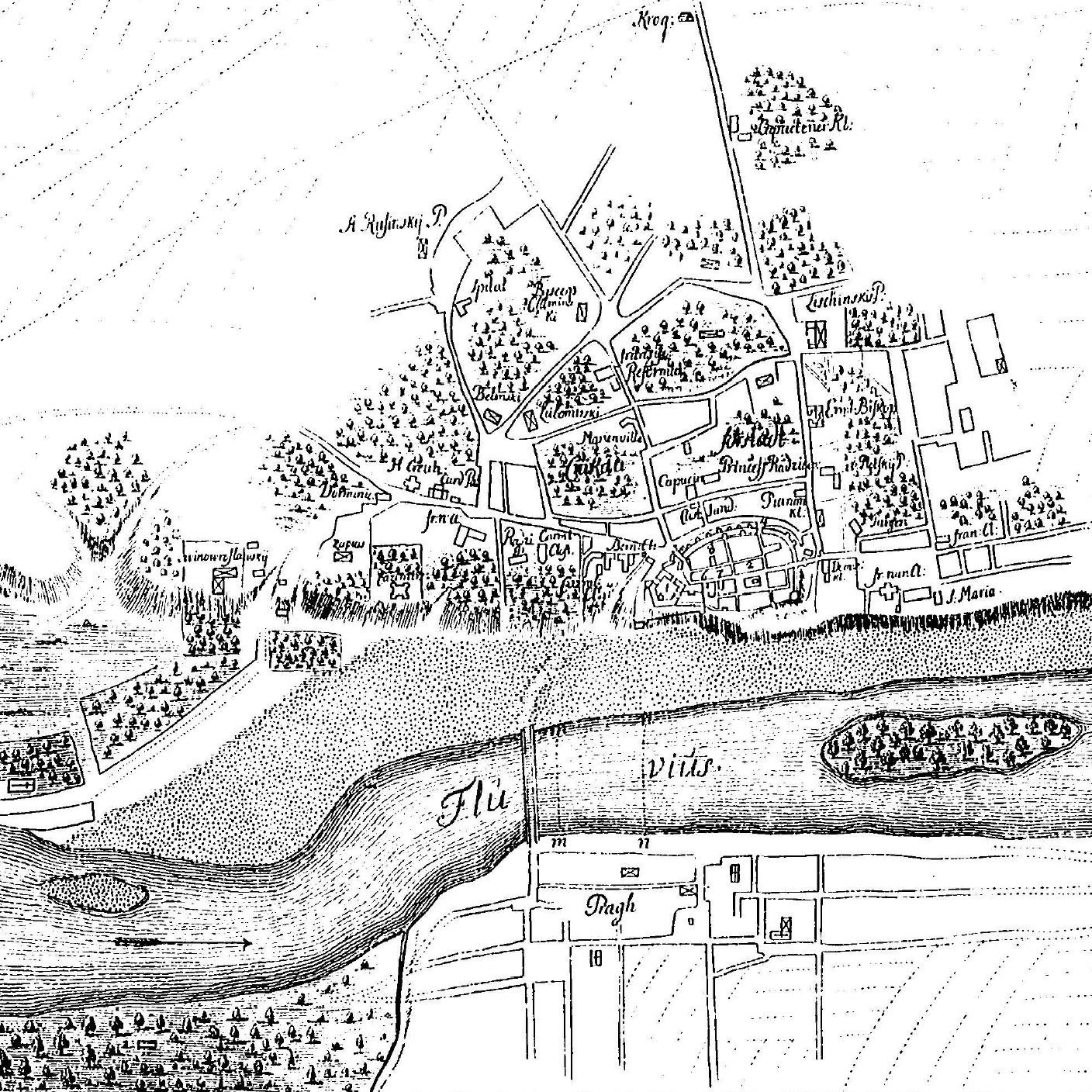
- Warsaw and Praga with the connecting bridge, 1705.
Date	14 October 1705 (O.S.); 15 October 1705 (Swedish calendar); 25 October 1705 (N.S.)
Location	Praga outside Warsaw, Poland
Result	Swedish victory

Belligerents
Swedish Empire	Polish–Lithuanian Commonwealth; Saxony; Tsardom of Russia

Commanders and leaders
Valentin Dahldorf, Gustaf Henrik Siegroth	Michał Serwacy Wiśniowiecki, Aleksandr Menshikov

Strength
1,000–1,500 men	5,000 men

Casualties and losses
200 killed or wounded	250 killed or wounded

The Battle of Praga took place on 25 October 1705 (N.S.), near the city of Warsaw, Poland during the fifth year of the Great Northern War. The Swedish army of more than 270 men assisted by approximately 140 soldiers from the Polish–Lithuanian Commonwealth under the command of Valentin Dahldorf defeated a combined Polish–Saxon–Russian force of about 5,000 men under Michał Serwacy Wiśniowiecki and Aleksandr Menshikov.

== Prelude ==
After the fruitless attack by Otto Arnold von Paykull to interrupt the coronation of king Stanisław Leszczyński in the battle of Warsaw, Polish commander Wiśniowiecki and Russian commander Menshikov attempted to surprise the Swedish patrol guarding the bridge going over the Vistula from Praga to Warsaw in order to capture and destroy the bridge which would, otherwise, greatly assist to the Swedish operations in the area. Only the Uppland and Dalarna regiments were stationed near Praga to protect the Polish Coronation in Warsaw, while the main army under Charles XII of Sweden was at Blonie.

== Battle ==
A part of the coalition army managed to completely surprise and overwhelm a Polish force of about 140 men—friendly to Leszczyński and the Swedes—inside Praga while the rest attacked the 40 Swedish infantrymen patrolling the bridgehead. These were, in turn, also surprised and the coalition forces managed to push out to the middle of the bridge before getting halted by twelve men of the patrol, guarding there. They could hold their defense until further Swedish reinforcements, alerted by the musket fire, from the Uppland regiment of 20 men under Dahldorf arrived, which forced the coalition forces back. However, at the same bridgehead the coalition forces were reinforced by the rest of their part having fought the Polish guard in Praga. They soon positioned all around the bridgehead and fired massive volleys and cannon fire—six cannons which they had earlier captured from the Poles—against the vulnerable Swedes who retreated back over the bridge after having lost many men dead and wounded. The bridge was then open for their opponents to capture and destroy. Soon, however, further Swedish reinforcements of 210 men from the Uppland and Dalarna regiments (100 from Dal) grouped and counterattacked—with a cold steel charge—the superior coalition forces at the bridge, who were thrown back once again towards Praga and then forced to retreat after the rest of the Dalarna Regiment under Gustaf Henrik Siegroth arrived, who chased them out, inflicting great casualties.

== Aftermath ==
In this action the Swedes and their Polish allies lost about 200 men. The Dalarna Regiment, having an unofficial status as elite in the Swedish army, suffered 17 killed and 53 wounded alone. The combined Polish–Saxon–Russian forces lost about 250 men. About 270 Swedes and 140 Poles participated in the fighting before the arrival of the full Dala regiment in the ending, which could estimate the full force to somewhere between 1,000 and 1,500 men. Additional Swedish units appeared soon, but they were too late to participate in the fighting.

== Literature ==
- Grimberg & Uddgren, Carl & Hugo (1914). Svenska krigarbragder (in Swedish). Norstedt Förlag. Stockholm.
- Wimmer, Jan (1956). Wojsko Rzeczypospolitej w dobie wojny północnej: 1700–1717.
- Pihlström, Anton & Westerlund, Carl (1906). 1Kungl. dalregementets historia 3, Kungl. dalregementet under karolinska tiden 1682–1721.
- Defoe, Daniel (1720). The History of the Wars, of His Late Majesty Charles XII, King of Sweden.
