= Battle of Poznań (1704) =

Battle in the Great Northern War

- Part of the Great Northern War
Date	8 August 1704 (O.S.); 9 August 1704 (Swedish calendar); 19 August 1704 (N.S.)
Location	Poznań, Poland
Result	Both side claim victory

Belligerents
Swedish Empire	Electorate of Saxony

Commanders and leaders
(Sweden) Johan August Meijerfeldt	(Electorate of Saxony) Johann Matthias von der Schulenburg

Strength
2,300 men	6,000 men

Casualties and losses
388 to 800	600

The Battle of Poznań took place on 19 August 1704 (N.S.) in Poznań, Poland during the Great Northern War.

It was a short battle between the Saxon forces of Johan Schulenburg and the Swedish under the command of Johan Mayerfeld. The Saxons were able to gain an advantage on the right flank and in the center, forcing the Swedes to retreat, but the latter overturned the Saxons on the left flank, realizing that they were not in an advantageous position, the Swedes retreated. Both sides declared victory; Vladimir Velikanov (2018) believes that the battle ended with the victory of the Saxons, as they captured the Swedish camp and the spoils. Another source believes that the victory remained with the Swedes.

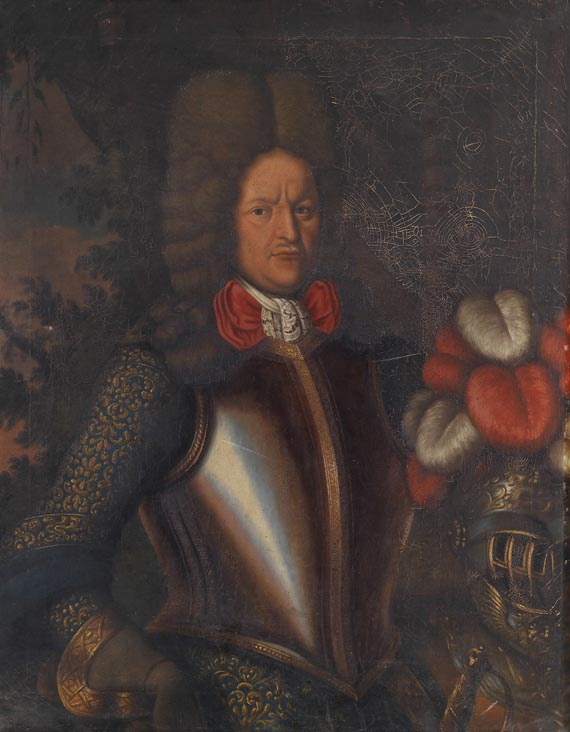
