= Civil war in Poland (1704–1706) =

Civil wars involving the states and peoples of Europe

- Part of the Great Northern War
Date	1704–1706
Location	Polish–Lithuanian Commonwealth
Result	Treaty of Altranstädt Victory of the Warsaw Confederation

Belligerents
Warsaw Confederation; Supported by (Swedish Empire) Sweden	Sandomierz Confederation; Supported by (Russian Empire) Russia

Commanders and leaders
Stanisław Leszczyński	Augustus II the Strong

The civil war in Poland was a military conflict from 1704 to 1706, and a part of a larger European conflict, the Great Northern War. It focused on the struggle for the Polish-Lithuanian throne between King and Grand Duke Stanisław I supported by his Warsaw Confederation and Sweden, and the Russian-backed Sandomierz Confederation of Augustus II the Strong. The war ended with Stanisław's victory and the Treaty of Altranstädt in 1706, in which August II renounced his claims to the Polish-Lithuanian throne. Stanisław's triumph would be short-lived, however, as by 1709 he would be forced to give up the throne to Augustus II once again.

== Background ==
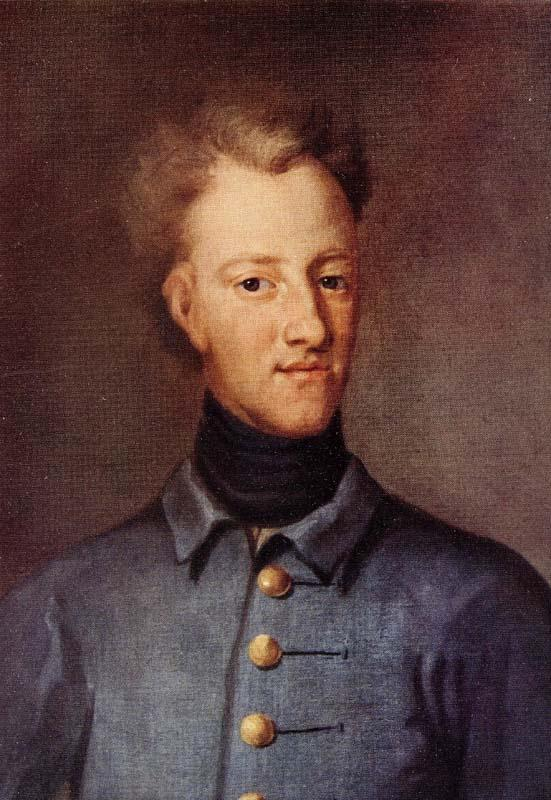
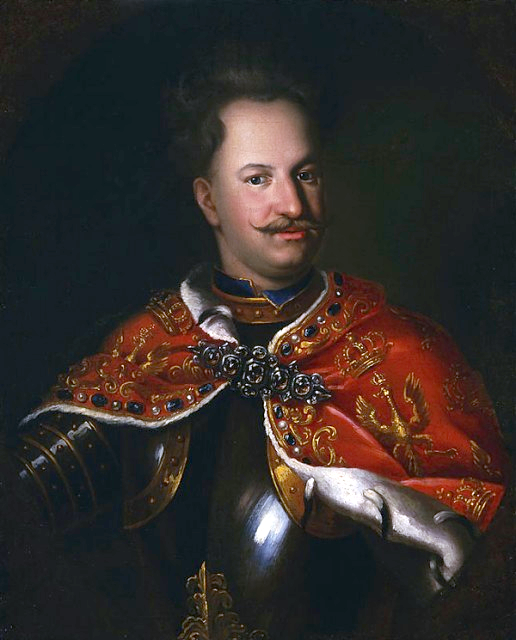
Charles XII (left) and Stanisław I (right)

At the onset of the Great Northern War, Augustus the Strong was king of Poland, Grand Duke of Lithuania and Elector of Saxony, having been elected in 1697. In 1699, he allied with the Russian tsar Peter the Great in the Treaty of Preobrazhenskoye and with Frederik IV of Denmark-Norway in the Treaty of Dresden, and joined their war with the Swedish Empire that followed in 1700 Soon, however, their alliance suffered a number of defeats, and led to Charles XII of Sweden invasion of Poland.

== Civil war ==
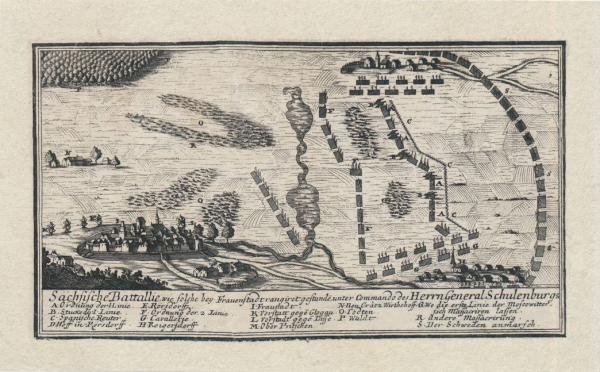
The battle of Fraustadt 1706

Swedish successes (in particular, the Battle of Klissow) led to a growing number of Polish-Lithuanian magnates switching sides, culminating in the formation of Warsaw Confederation on 16 February 1704 and the election of Swedish-endorsed voivode of Poznań, Stanisław I, as the new Polish king on 12 July 1704.

Augustus the Strong still enjoyed the support of a Polish faction, the Sandomierz Confederation (formed on 20 May 1704), and about 75% of the Polish army. Augustus and his supporters declared war on Sweden, and joined the anti-Swedish Russian coalition at Narva on 30 August 1704.

By October 1703 Augustus had to abandon Warsaw. A Russo-Saxo-Polish-Lithuanian army was then assembled at Polotsk (Polatsk, Połock, Polockas), another allied army in Saxony, and a third allied force commanded by General Otto Arnold von Paykull (Pajkul) advanced towards Warsaw, where Charles XII and Stanisław sojourned. Pajkul's Saxo-Polish-Lithuanian forces reached the outskirts of Warsaw on 31 July 1705, where they were defeated. The army at Polotsk was denied westward advance by Swedish forces under Adam Ludwig Lewenhaupt. Thus, Stanisław was crowned king of Poland in Warsaw on 4 October 1705 soon afterward he and his supporters concluded an alliance with the Swedish Empire in the Treaty of Warsaw in November 1705.

Augustus was not done yet. In early 1706, he approached Warsaw with a cavalry force and ordered Johann Matthias von der Schulenburg to move the army assembled in Saxony into Poland–Lithuania. Schulenburg was intercepted and defeated by Carl Gustav Rehnskiöld in the Battle of Fraustadt (Wschowa) on 13 February 1706. The army assembled in Polotsk had been moved to Grodno where it was tactically defeated and forced to withdraw eastwards around the same time. Charles XII then occupied Saxony, forcing Augustus to abandon both the Polish-Lithuanian crown and his allies in the Treaty of Altranstädt on 13 October 1706, in which Augustus was forced to give up his claims to the Polish-Lithuanian crown.

== Aftermath ==
Stanisław's reign was short. Initially, things were looking bright for the Warsaw Confederation, as the Swedes drove the Russian occupiers out of Belarus in January–October 1708, and the Cossack Hetmanate led by Ivan Mazepa and the Zaporizhian Sich led by Kost Hordiienko joined forces with Sweden as well. However, the Battle of Koniecpol (21 November 1708) was a major victory for the Sandomierz Confederation over the Warsaw Confederation. Some of the nobles of Lesser Poland, who had been eager to support Stanisław, now defected to Augustus. Not all was lost, however. The Swedes and Mazepa's Cossacks mostly won victories in the early months of 1709, and Stanisław's grand hetman of Lithuania Jan Kazimierz Sapieha defeated the tsar-backed Lithuanian hetman Grzegorz Antoni Ogiński in the Battle of Łachowce on 12 April 1709. Further combat actions against the Russians in May had mixed results; Sapieha eventually retreated to Brest, where the king gave him a new army in early June.

Nevertheless, the Russians won a key victory over the Swedes and Mazepa's Cossacks at the Battle of Poltava in July 1709, undermining Stanisław's position in the Commonwealth. Soon after the Swedish defeat, Stanisław I abandoned Poland-Lithuania, and Augustus resumed his position as the Polish king. Augustus' position was backed up by the Russians, who would assume an increasingly dominating role in the Commonwealth's internal politics following this conflict.

== In popular culture ==
The civil war, together with a later War of the Polish Succession (1733–1738) in which Leszczyński challenged Augustus' son, was immortalized in a Polish saying "Jedni do Sasa, drudzy do Lasa" (lit. "Some to Sas, other to Las"; with "Sas", meaning "the Saxon, being Augustus' nickname, and "Las", short for "Leszczyński", Stanisław's family name), denoting a state of division, disorder and anarchy. Another variant of the saying is "Od Sasa do Lasa" (lit. "From Sas to Las").

== See also ==
- Polish–Swedish union
- History of Poland (1648-1764)
- Silent Sejm
- War of the Polish Succession

== Bibliography ==
- Anisimov, Evgeniĭ Viktorovich (1993). The reforms of Peter the Great. Progress through coercion in Russia. The New Russian history. M.E. Sharpe. ISBN 1-56324-047-5.
- Bromley, J. S. (1970). Rise of Great Britain & Russia, 1688–1725. The New Cambridge Modern History. Vol. 6. CUP Archive. ISBN 0-521-07524-6.
- Frost, Robert I (2000). The Northern Wars. War, State and Society in Northeastern Europe 1558–1721. Harlow: Longman. ISBN 978-0-582-06429-4.
