= 1711 in Russia =

- Decades: 1690s; 1700s; 1710s; 1720s; 1730s
- See also: History of Russia; Timeline of Russian history; List of years in Russia

Events from the year 1711 in Russia

== Incumbents ==
- Monarch - Peter I

== Events ==
- Pruth River Campaign
- Establishment of the Arsenal Design Bureau
- Establishment of Dmitrovsk
- Establishment of the Governing Senate

== Births ==
- Stepan Krasheninnikov
- Mikhail Lomonosov
