= 1710 in Russia =

- Decades: 1690s; 1700s; 1710s; 1720s; 1730s
- See also: History of Russia; Timeline of Russian history; List of years in Russia

Events from the year 1710 in Russia (The Tsardom of Russia).

== Incumbents ==
- Monarch – Peter I

== Events ==
- January 27, 1710 – Peter The Great sets first Russian state budget.
- March 22, 1710 - June 12, 1710 – Siege of Viborg, a second Russian attempt to capture the fortress port of Viborg from Sweden.
- October 14, 1710 – The Russian guberniyas (administrative subdivisions) were divided into lots according to noble population.
- November 20, 1710 – War is declared by Peter The Great against the Ottomans after the Ottomans refused to evict Charles XII of Sweden, beginning the Pruth River Campaign of 1710-1713.
- Founding of the Alexander Nevsky Lavra Monastery, established by Peter The Great in 1710.
- Founding of Pushkin, Saint Petersburg in 1710 under the name of Tsarskoye Selo (Tsar's Village), which was the residence of the Russian imperial family (House of Romanov) and other visiting nobles.
- Capitulation of Estonia and Livonia, with the Swedish dominions Estonia and Livonia being integrated into the Russian empire in 1710.
- Founding of the Trångsund Fortress, established by Peter The Great in 1710.
- Civil script (гражданский шрифт) was imposed by Peter The Great in 1710, making it easier to read and write Russian.
- Peter The Great took the first census in 1710 that was habitation-based, primality counting the number of "homesteads".

== Births ==
- Pavlos Condoidis (Russian doctor who opened first midwifery school in Russia in 1757) was born in 1710 in Greece.
