= 1709 in Russia =

- Decades: 1680s; 1690s; 1700s; 1710s; 1720s
- See also: History of Russia; Timeline of Russian history; List of years in Russia

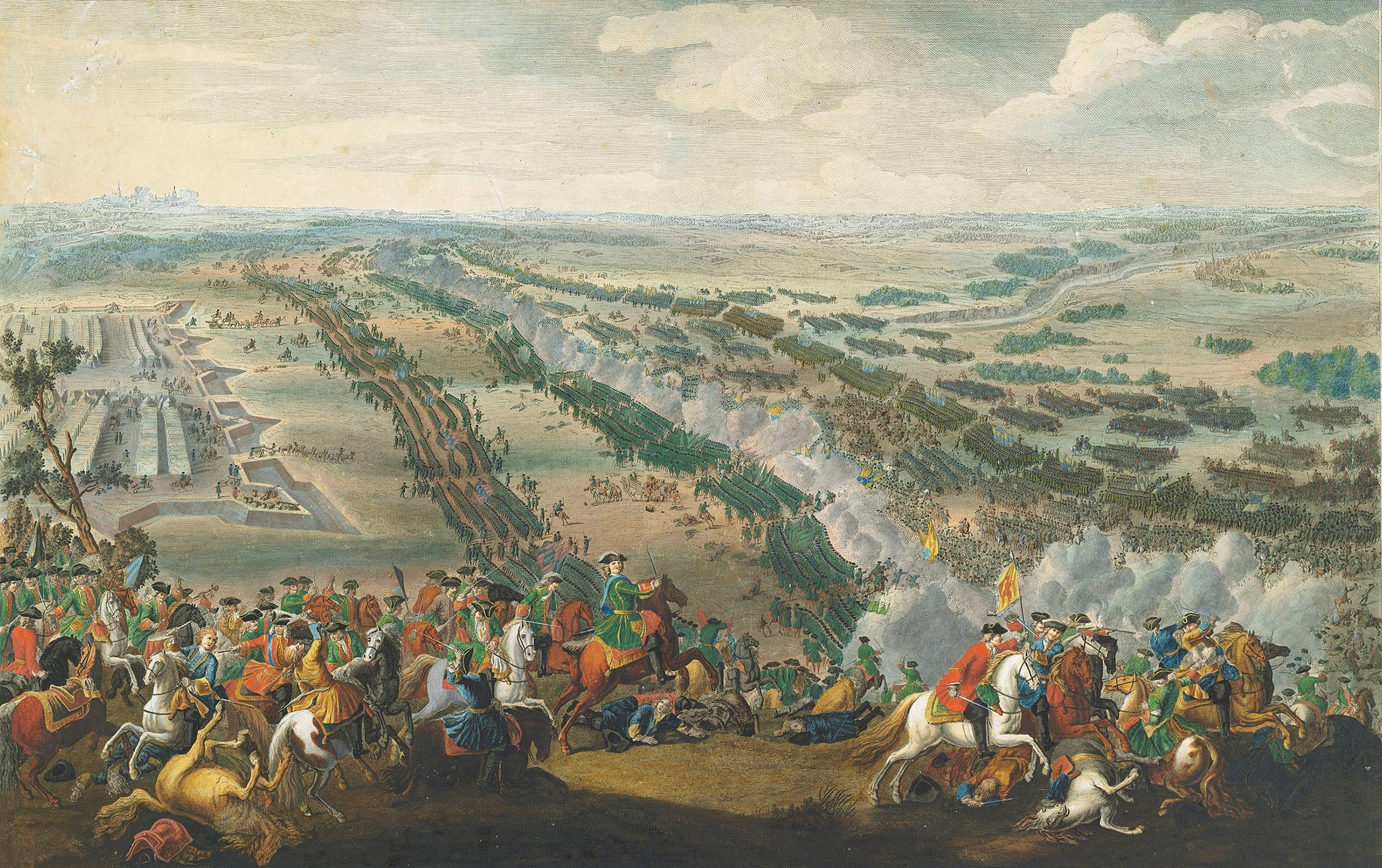
Battle of Poltava by Pierre-Denis Martin

Events from the year 1709 in Russia.

== Incumbents ==
- Monarch – Peter I

== Events ==
- 24 January - The Central Naval Museum was established.
- 20–22 February - Swedish forces win the Battle of Krasnokutsk–Gorodnoye
- 30 June - Swedish forces surrender at Perevolochna
- 8 July - Russians win the Battle of Poltava, halting the Swedish invasion of Russia.
- 9 October - Treaty of Thorn (1709) between Russia and Poland-Lithuania.

== Births ==
- 29 December - Elizabeth of Russia

== Deaths ==
- 28 October - Demetrius of Rostov
