= Treaty of Dresden (disambiguation) =

Treaty of Dresden may refer to

- the Treaty of Dresden (1699), a Saxo-Danish alliance during the Great Northern War
- the Treaty of Dresden (1709), a treaty re-establishing the Saxo-Danish alliance during the Great Northern War
- the Treaty of Dresden (1745), ending the Second Silesian War

== See also ==
- Dresden Coinage Convention (1838)
