= 1701 in Russia =

- Decades: 1680s; 1690s; 1700s; 1710s; 1720s
- See also: History of Russia; Timeline of Russian history; List of years in Russia

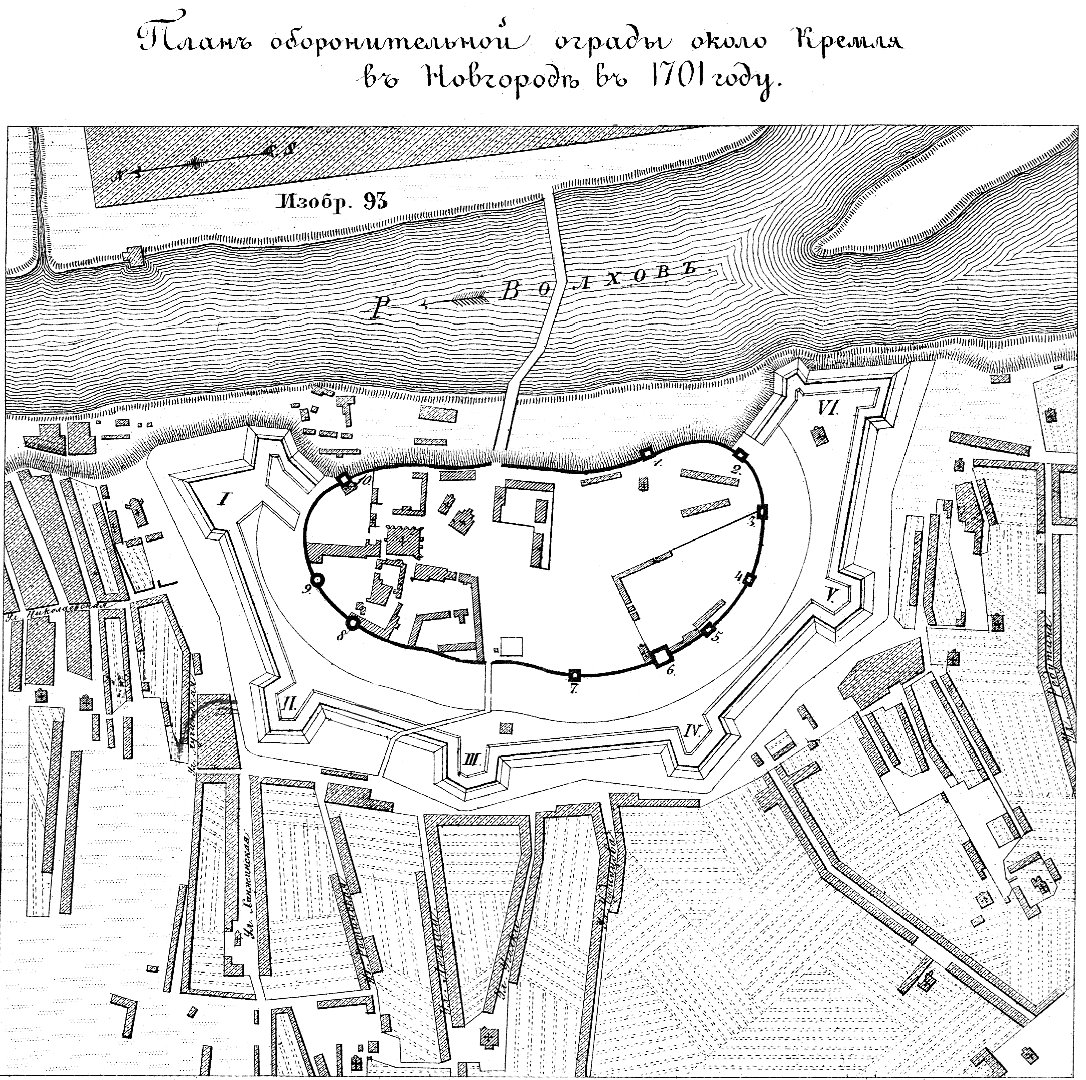
Новгородские бастионы 1701 года

Events from the year 1701 in Russia

== Incumbents ==
- Monarch – Peter I

== Events ==
- Battle of Petschora
- Battle of Rauge
- The settlement that became Novozybkov was established in 1701 under the name Zybkaia, within the territory administered by the Starodub Cossack regiment.
- On 29 December 1701 (Old Style; 9 January 1702 New Style), the Battle of Erastfer was fought. in which Russian troops led by Field Marshal Boris Sheremetev routed a numerically inferior Swedish detachment.
- Peter I founded a navigation and mathematics school in Moscow to train future naval and military officers.
- In 1701, Peter I transferred administration of monastic landholdings and revenues to a new state body, the Monastyrskii Prikaz.

== Births ==
- Andrey Matveyev – painter
- Dmitry Laptev

== Deaths ==
- Jan Thesingh
- Alexander Lopukhin
