= 1705 in Russia =

- Decades: 1680s; 1690s; 1700s; 1710s; 1720s
- See also: History of Russia; Timeline of Russian history; List of years in Russia

Events from the year 1705 in Russia

== Incumbents ==
- Monarch – Peter I

== Events ==
- 7 March – Biryuch is founded.
- 26 July – Battle of Gemauerthof: Russian troops under Boris Sheremetev clash with Swedish forces led by Adam Ludwig Lewenhaupt near Gemauerthof during the Courland operation of the Great Northern War.
- 9 August – Battle of Warsaw: Swedish cavalry under Carl Nieroth defeat the Saxon-Polish allied forces commanded by Otto Arnold von Paykull, who ends up being captured.
- 10 August – A major uprising erupts in Astrakhan against Peter I’s new taxes and duties, arbitrary levies, repression, and the harsh enforcement of the ban on Russian dress and beards.
- 20 August – Battle of Hogland: In a minor naval engagement near Gogland Island in the Gulf of Finland, the Swedish ship Reval defeats seven Russian galleys, with the battle ending in a Swedish victory.
- 25 October – Battle of Praga: Swedish forces, supported by Polish allies, repel a larger coalition of Polish, Saxon, and Russian troops led by Michał Serwacy Wiśniowiecki and Aleksandr Menshikov at Praga near Warsaw.

=== Undated ===
- The Russian Naval Infantry is established.
- Rovenky is founded.
- Peter the Great introduces a beard tax, requiring others to pay a fee and carry a medal; with those without tokens to be fined by the local law enforcement.
- A punitive expedition is led by Sergeyev in Ufa County, demanding 5,000 horses from the Bashkirs. The Bashkirs resist the taxes and authority, sparking the Bashkir rebellion of 1704-1711.

== Births ==
Pavel Petrovich (1705 - 1707) – the second child and second son born to Tsar Peter the Great and his second wife, Catherine I.
