= 1704 in Russia =

- Decades: 1680s; 1690s; 1700s; 1710s; 1720s
- See also: History of Russia; Timeline of Russian history; List of years in Russia

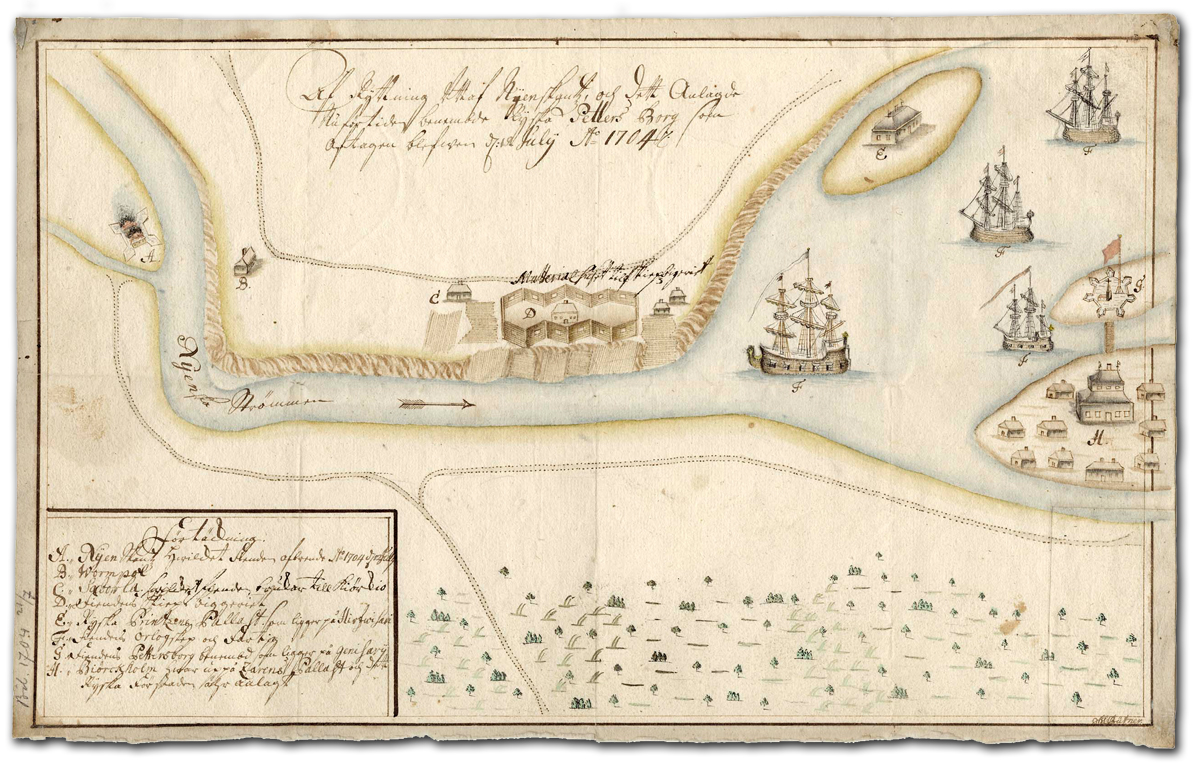
Sankt Petersburg

Events from the year 1704 in Russia

== Incumbents ==
- Monarch – Peter I

== Events ==
- Treaty of Narva
- Admiralty Shipyard

== Births ==
- Afanasy Abramovich Goncharov (1704–1784): A major Russian industrialist and merchant who organized paper and linen manufacturing facilities in Russia.
- Peter Petrovich (1704–1707): The first-born son of Peter the Great and Catherine I.

== Deaths ==
- Tsarevna Sophia Alekseyevna of Russia (1657–1704): The former Regent of Russia.
