= Treaty of Warsaw (1705) =

1705 treaty between Sweden and Poland–Lithuania

- Type: Peace treaty, alliance
- Signed: ^{18}/_{28} November 1705
- Location: Warsaw, Poland
- Parties: Swedish Empire; Polish-Lithuanian Commonwealth (Warsaw Confederation)
- Language: German

The Treaty of Warsaw (Polish: Traktat warszawski, Swedish: Freden i Warszawa) was concluded on 18 November (O.S.) / 28 November 1705 during the Great Northern War. It was a peace treaty and an alliance between the Swedish Empire and the faction of the Polish–Lithuanian Commonwealth loyal to Stanisław Leszczyński.

== Historical context ==
Early in the Great Northern War, Charles XII of Sweden campaigned in the Polish–Lithuanian Commonwealth, where Augustus the Strong, Elector of Saxony, was king since 1697. Aimed at dethroning his adversary, Charles XII managed to have his candidate Stanisław Leszczyński elected king of Poland on 12 July 1704. Augustus' ally Peter the Great, tsar of Russia, was reluctant to engage Charles XII in a major battle as a consequence of the decisive defeat his army had suffered at Narva in 1700. A faction of the Polish and Lithuanian nobles did not accept Leszczyński's election, which had been imposed in neglect of the commonwealth's customs, and organized in the Sandomir or Sandomierz Confederation in support of Augustus. They declared the election illegal, outlawed Leszczyński's supporters who were organized in the Warsaw Confederation, declared war on Sweden and allied with Russia in the Treaty of Narva.

A Russo-Saxo-Polish-Lithuanian army was then assembled at Polotsk (Polatsk, Połock, Polockas), another allied army in Saxony, and a third allied force commanded by General Otto Arnold von Paykull (Pajkul) advanced towards Warsaw, where Charles XII and Leszczyński sojourned. Pajkul's Saxo-Polish-Lithuanian horse reached the outskirts of Warsaw on 31 July 1705, where they were defeated. The army at Polotsk was denied westward advance by Swedish forces under Adam Ludwig Lewenhaupt. Thus, Leszczyński was crowned king of Poland in Warsaw on 4 October 1705, and Sweden and the faction of the commonwealth represented by Leszczyński signed the treaty of Warsaw on 28 November.

== Terms ==
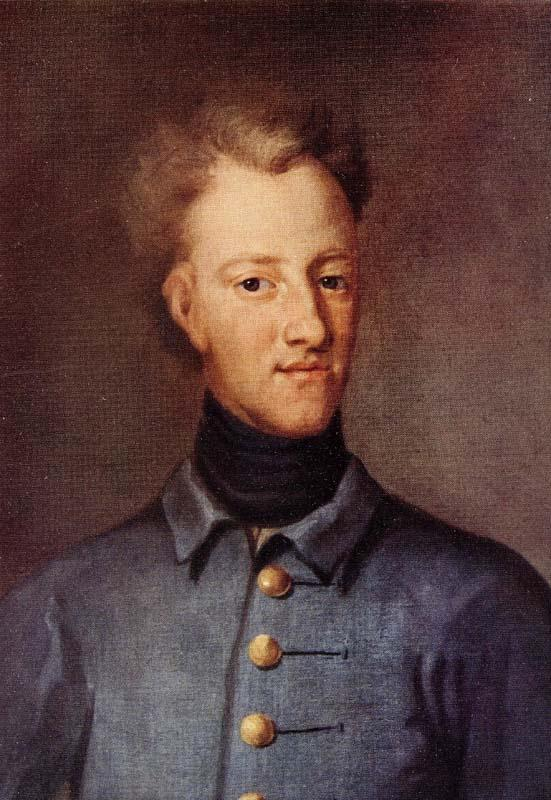
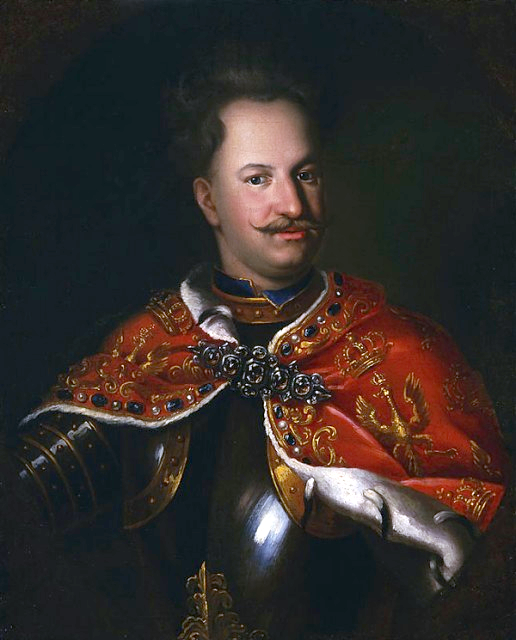
Charles XII (left) and Stanisław Leszczyński (right)

Sweden was allowed to occupy the Polish–Lithuanian Commonwealth's towns and fortresses and recruit soldiers in its territory without restriction. Anti-Swedish alliances concluded by the commonwealth were declared void, Poland was to conclude treaties only with Charles XII's approval.

The commonwealth's regions Courland, Lithuania, Royal Prussia and Ruthenia were to export goods only through the Swedish port of Riga, the Polish port Połąga (Palanga, Palonga) in Courland was to be abandoned. In the territory of the commonwealth, Swedish merchants were granted substantial tax exemption and the right to settle and trade.

The treaty further divided the commonwealth's territories then under Russian occupation among the parties: The areas of Smolensk and Kiev were to be re-integrated into Poland–Lithuania, while Polish Livonia and Courland were to be ceded to Sweden upon their reconquest.

For future candidates to the Polish throne, the treaty was made part of the pacta conventa, meaning it had to be supported for any candidacy to become valid.

== Aftermath ==
As intended, the treaty made an inner-Polish-Lithuanian reconciliation of the Warsaw and Sandomir confederations impossible. In early 1706, Augustus the Strong approached Warsaw with a cavalry force and ordered Johann Matthias von der Schulenburg to move the army assembled in Saxony into Poland–Lithuania. Schulenburg was intercepted and defeated by Carl Gustav Rehnskiöld in the Battle of Fraustadt. The army assembled in Polotsk had been moved to Grodno (Hrodna, Gardinas, Garten), where it was tactically defeated and forced to withdraw eastwards. Charles XII then occupied Saxony, forcing Augustus to abandon both the Polish crown and his allies in the Treaty of Altranstädt (1706).

== Sources ==
=== Bibliography ===
- Anisimov, Evgeniĭ Viktorovich (1993). The reforms of Peter the Great. Progress through coercion in Russia. The New Russian history. M.E. Sharpe. ISBN 1-56324-047-5.
- Bromley, J. S. (1970). Rise of Great Britain & Russia, 1688-1725. The New Cambridge Modern History. Vol. 6. CUP Archive. ISBN 0-521-07524-6.
- Frost, Robert I (2000). The Northern Wars. War, State and Society in Northeastern Europe 1558-1721. Harlow: Longman. ISBN 978-0-582-06429-4.
