= Patkul =

Patkul may refer to:

- Johann Patkul, Livonian politician and agitator of Baltic German extraction
- German exonym for Patkule, a village in Latvia
