= Treaty of Thorn (1709) =

1709 treaty between Poland-Lithuania and Russia

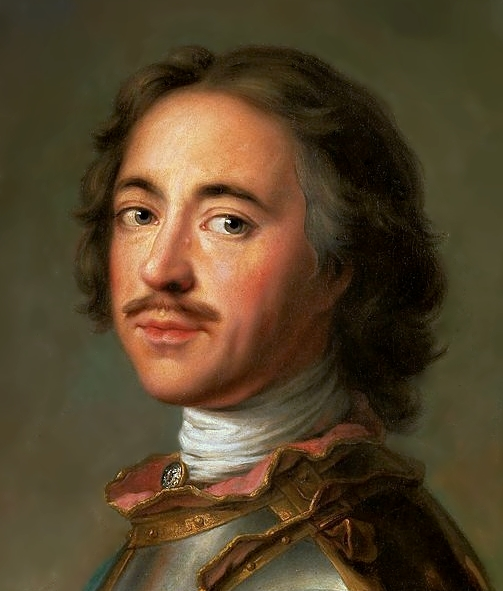
- Peter the Great
- Type: Alliance
- Signed: 9 October 1709
- Location: Thorn (Toruń)
- Parties: Peter the Great; Augustus the Strong
- Language: Russian

The Treaty of Thorn was concluded on 9 October 1709 between Augustus the Strong of Poland-Lithuania and Peter the Great of Russia in Thorn (Toruń), during the Great Northern War. The parties revived their alliance, which Charles XII of Sweden had destroyed in the Treaty of Altranstädt (1706), and agreed on restoring the Polish crown to Augustus.

== Background ==
With the decisive Swedish defeat in the Battle of Poltava, Russian tsar Peter the Great had gained the upper hand in the Great Northern War. With the main Swedish army destroyed and Swedish king Charles XII exiled to the Ottoman Empire, Augustus the Strong, whom Charles XII had dethroned as Polish king in the Treaty of Altranstädt (1706), was able to march into the Polish–Lithuanian Commonwealth and re-claim the Polish crown from the Swedish ally Stanisław Leszczyński. The territory re-conquered by Augustus in 1709 included the Polish city of Thorn (Toruń), where he met with Peter the Great to hash out the terms for a common policy regarding northeastern Europe.

== Terms and implementation ==
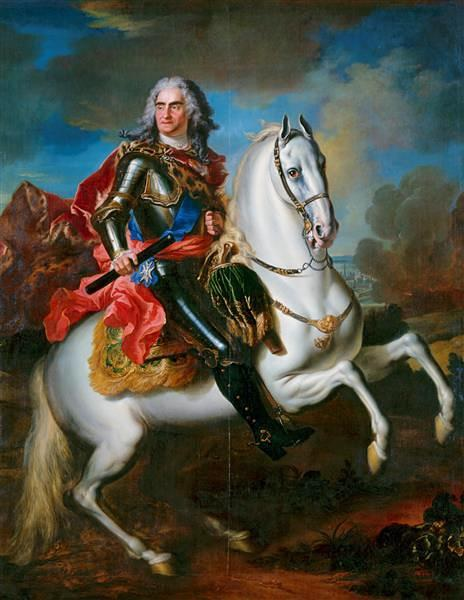
Augustus the Strong

Peter supported Augustus' restoration as Polish king, after he had made sure that the highest offices in the Polish–Lithuanian Commonwealth were occupied by nobles supportive of himself. Augustus was obliged to persecute anti-Russian groups in Poland. In a secret article, it was agreed that Swedish Livonia was to be partitioned upon its conquest from the Swedish Empire, with Augustus gaining the southern part and Peter gaining the North (Estonia).

In contrast to the first alliance at Preobrazheskoye, the conditions of Thorn were largely dictated by Peter the Great, whose once close relations with Augustus the Strong had cooled down since the Altranstädt. Though Augustus was again promised conquered territory in Livonia, this provision did not become effective.

After the conclusion of the treaty, Peter the Great resumed the re-creation of a wide anti-Swedish alliance. He travelled to nearby Marienwerder to meet with Frederick I of Prussia, before he departed to the Russian camp near Riga, where he arrived on 10 November. The Dano-Russian alliance which Charles XII had destroyed in Travendal (1700) was revived in the subsequent Treaty of Copenhagen by Peter's diplomats at the Danish court.

In early 1710, Augustus the Strong entered the Polish capital Warsaw, forcing his adversary Stanisław Leszczyński to exile to Stralsund in Swedish Pomerania. After Augustus had further consolidated his position in Poland-Lithuania, he began campaigning on Swedish soil in 1711, when he invaded Pomerania and laid siege to Stralsund together with Danish and Russian forces in the first combined campaign of these allies in the Great Northern War. Peter the Great had meanwhile concluded his campaigns in Swedish Livonia.

== Sources ==
=== Bibliography ===
- Anisimov, Evgeniĭ Viktorovich (1993). The reforms of Peter the Great. Progress through coercion in Russia. The New Russian history. M.E. Sharpe. ISBN 1-56324-047-5.
- Donnert, Erich (1989). Peter der Große (in German). Böhlau. ISBN 3-205-05193-9.
- Groß, Reiner (2007). Die Wettiner. Kohlhammer Urban Taschenbücher (in German). Vol. 621. Kohlhammer Verlag. ISBN 3-17-018946-8.
