= List of wars involving Belarus =

This is a list of wars and humanitarian conflicts involving the Republic of Belarus and its predecessor states (Belarusian People's Republic and Byelorussian SSR). Notable militarised interstate disputes are included.

Belarusian victory
Belarusian defeat
Another result (e.g. a treaty or peace without a clear result, status quo ante bellum, result of civil or internal conflict, result unknown or indecisive, inconclusive)
Ongoing conflict

== Russian Empire ==
Conflict	Belarus & allies	Belarus's opposition	Result
World War I/Russian Civil War (1918)	Belarusian People's Republic; Germany	Bolsheviks: Russian SFSR	Belarusian People's Republic exiled
Slutsk uprising (1920)	Nationalist forces loyal to the Belarusian People's Republic	Russian SFSR; Byelorussian SSR	Rebellion suppressed
Polish–Soviet War (1919–1921): Soviet westward offensive of 1918–1919	Russian SFSR; Ukrainian SSR; Byelorussian SSR; Polrewkom	Second Polish Republic; Ukrainian People's Republic	Inconclusive: Peace of Riga; Both sides claimed victory

== Soviet Union ==
Conflict	Belarus & allies	Belarus's opposition	Result
Polish-Belarusian ethnic conflict (1939—1954)	Byelorussian SSR; Belarusian collaborators	Polish people Home Army; Cursed soldiers: Grodno Self Defense; Wołkowysk Self Defense	Both sides claimed victory
World War II (1941–1944)	Soviet Union: Byelorussian SSR	Nazi Germany: Belarusian Central Council	Victory: Belarusian Central Council dissolved, results include the Independence Day (Belarus)
Soviet–Afghan War (1979–1989)	Soviet Union: Byelorussian SSR; Afghanistan	Afghan mujahideen	Soviet withdrawal from Afghanistan; After USSR's withdrawal, Afghan Civil War continues

== Republic of Belarus ==
Conflict	Belarus & allies	Belarus's opposition	Result
Belarusian involvement in the Russian invasion of Ukraine (2022–present) (part of the Russo-Ukrainian War, 2014–present)	Russian Federation; Belarus (provision of territory); Donetsk People's Republic; Luhansk People's Republic	Ukraine: Kastuś Kalinoŭski Regiment; Belarusian Volunteer Corps	Ongoing: Belarus provides its territory and infrastructure to the Russian invasion forces and assistance to injured Russian soldiers.

== See also ==
- Belarusian mercenaries in Ivory Coast

Lists of wars and battles involving former states on what is now Belarus:

- List of wars involving Kievan Rus'
- List of wars and battles involving Galicia–Volhynia
- List of wars involving the Polish–Lithuanian Commonwealth
- List of wars and battles involving the Principality of Smolensk
- List of battles of the French invasion of Russia
