= List of wars and battles involving the Principality of Smolensk =

This is a list of wars and battles involving the Principality of Smolensk (1054–1508). The reigning clans of Smolensk were the Yaroslavichi 1054–1126; the Rostislavichi 1126–1404; and the Gediminids 1404–1508.

Victory of Smolensk (and allies)
Defeat of Smolensk (and allies)
Another result*

*e.g. result unknown or indecisive/inconclusive, result of internal conflict inside Smolensk, status quo ante bellum, or a treaty or peace without a clear result.

Date	Conflict	Combatant 1	Combatant 2	Result
1146–1159	1146–1159 Kievan succession crisis (also known as Internecine war in Rus' 1146–1154): Casus belli: death of Vsevolod Olgovich II of Kiev	Iziaslavichi (senior Mstislavichi): Iziaslav of Volhynia (1146–54); Mstislav of Pereyaslavl; Novgorod Republic (1146–55; 57–58); Olgovichi of Chernigov	Rostislavichi (junior Mstislavichi): Rostislav of Smolensk; Yaroslav of Halych (1158); Novgorod Republic (1158–59); Yuri Dolgorukiy of Suzdalia (1146–57); Cuman allies (1147); Novgorod Republic (1155–57)	Mixed results: Olgovichi of Chernigov lost Kiev; Iziaslavichi of Volhynia lost Pereyaslavl and Novgorod; Rostislavichi of Smolensk gained Kiev and Novgorod; Yurievichi of Suzdalia gained Pereyaslavl
1158–1161	Kievan succession crisis: Smolensk campaign of 1159—1160; Siege of Vshchizh 1160; Siege of Bilhorod-Kyivsky (1161)			Rostislav of Smolensk victory: Rostislav of Smolensk became prince of Kiev
1167–1169	1167–1169 Kievan succession crisis: Casus belli: death of Rostislav I of Kiev; Iziaslavichi of Volhynia gained Kiev & Novgorod (1167–1168); Sack of Kiev (1169) by Rostislavichi–Yurievichi–Olgovichi coalition; Siege of Novgorod (1170)	Iziaslavichi of Volhynia: Principality of Kiev; Principality of Volhynia; Novgorod Republic	Andrey Bogolyubsky's coalition: Yurievichi of Suzdalia; Olgovichi of Chernigov; Rostislavichi of Smolensk	Coalition victory: Yurievichi gained control over Kiev (1169); Novgorodians & Iziaslavichi defeated coalition (1170); Novgorodians expelled the Iziaslavichi (1170); Yurievichi gained control over Novgorod (1171)
1171–1173	1171–1173 Kievan succession crisis: Casus belli: death of prince Gleb of Kiev; Siege of Vyshgorod (1173)	Kiev and allies: Rostislavichi of Smolensk; Iziaslavichi of Volhynia; Principality of Galicia?; Olgovichi of Chernigov (joined Kiev near end)	Andrey's second coalition: Yurievichi of Suzdalia; Novgorod Republic; various other princes; Olgovichi of Chernigov (defected to Kiev near end)	Kiev & Rostislavichi of Smolensk victory: Andrey's coalition defeated; Yurievichi lost power; Andrey murdered by own boyars (1174)
1180–81	Northern campaign of Sviatoslav Vsevolodovich			Mixed results
1212–1216	Vladimir-Suzdal war of succession: Battle of Lipitsa 1216	Rostov (Konstantin); Novgorod (Mstislav); Supported by: Rostislavichi of Smolensk	Vladimir (Yuri); Zalessky (Yaroslav); Supported by: Olgovichi of Chernigov	Victory for Konstantin of Rostov and Mstislav of Novgorod
1223	Battle of the Kalka River (first Mongol invasion of Kievan Rus')	Principality of Kiev; Principality of Galicia–Volhynia; Principality of Chernigov; Principality of Smolensk Cuman–Kipchak Confederation	Mongol Empire; Brodnici	Crushing defeat: Armies of the Rus' principalities and Cumans mostly destroyed; Mongols plundered some towns and retreated east towards Volga Bulgaria, where they were defeated in the Battle of Samara Bend
1228–1236/40	Internecine war in Rus' 1228–1240: Casus belli: death of Mstyslav Mstyslavych Udatnyi	Principality of Volhynia; Principality of Kiev; Principality of Smolensk	Principality of Novgorod-Seversk; Cuman–Kipchak Confederation	Daniel of Galicia–Volhynia victory
1239	Lithuanian attack on Smolensk (1239)	Principality of Smolensk; Novgorod Republic	Grand Duchy of Lithuania	Smolensk–Novgorodian victory
1285	Siege of Smolensk (1285)	Principality of Smolensk	Principality of Bryansk	Smolensk victory
1334	Siege of Smolensk (1334)	Principality of Smolensk	Principality of Bryansk	Smolensk victory
1340	Siege of Smolensk (1340)	Principality of Smolensk	Golden Horde: Moscow; Ryazan; Nizhny Novgorod-Suzdal; Rostov; Yuriev; Fominsk; Drutsk	Smolensk victory
1368–1372	Lithuanian–Muscovite War (1368–1372)	Grand Duchy of Lithuania; Principality of Tver; Principality of Smolensk (1st and 2nd raid)	Principality of Moscow	Treaty of Lyubutsk: Lithuanian retreat
1386	Battle of the Vikhra River	Principality of Smolensk	Grand Duchy of Lithuania	Lithuanian victory
1395	Capture of Smolensk	Principality of Smolensk	Grand Duchy of Lithuania	Lithuanian victory
1399	Battle of the Vorskla River	Grand Duchy of Lithuania: Principality of Kiev; Principality of Polotsk; Principality of Smolensk; Principality of Bryansk; Kingdom of Poland; Moldavia; Wallachia; Teutonic Knights; Forces of Tokhtamysh	Golden Horde Supported by: Principality of Moscow	Golden Horde victory
1401	Siege of Smolensk (1401)	Principality of Smolensk	Grand Duchy of Lithuania	Smolensk victory
1404	Siege of Smolensk (1404)	Principality of Smolensk	Grand Duchy of Lithuania	Lithuanian victory: Vytautas installed governors over Smolensk; End of Rostislavichi dynasty in Smolensk
1410	Battle of Grunwald	Poland; Lithuania; Various allies including Smolensk	Teutonic Order: Various allies and mercenaries	Polish–Lithuanian victory
1440	Smolensk Uprising	Smolensk citizens	Grand Duchy of Lithuania	Lithuanian victory: Uprising suppressed
1500	Battle of Vedrosha	Grand Duchy of Lithuania: Principality of Smolensk	Principality of Moscow	Muscovite victory
1502	Siege of Smolensk (1502)	Grand Duchy of Lithuania: Principality of Smolensk	Principality of Moscow	Lithuanian victory

== See also ==
- Armies of the Rus' principalities
- List of wars involving Kievan Rus'
- List of wars and battles involving Galicia–Volhynia
- List of wars and battles involving the Golden Horde
- List of wars involving Lithuania
- List of wars involving the Polish–Lithuanian Commonwealth
- List of wars involving the Principality of Moscow
- List of wars involving the Novgorod Republic
- List of wars involving the Principality of Tver
- List of wars involving Belarus
- List of wars involving Russia
- List of wars involving Ukraine

== Bibliography ==
- Martin, Janet (2007). Medieval Russia: 980–1584. Second Edition. E-book. Cambridge: Cambridge University Press. ISBN 978-0-511-36800-4.
- Pelenski, Jaroslaw (1988). "The Contest for the "Kievan Succession" (1155–1175): The Religious-Ecclesiastical Dimension". Harvard Ukrainian Studies. 12/13: 761–780. JSTOR 41036344.
- Гумилев, Лев (2023). От Руси к России. Moscow: Москва. ISBN 978-5-17-153845-3.
