= Battle of Koniecpol =

Battle in the Great Northern War

- Part of the Great Northern War and the Swedish invasion of Russia
Date	21 November 1708
Location	Koniecpol, Poland 50°47′N 19°41′E
Result	Sandomierz Confederation victory

Belligerents
Sandomierz Confederation (anti-Swedish; supporters of king Augustus II the Strong)	Warsaw Confederation (pro-Swedish; supporters of king Stanisław Leszczyński)

Commanders and leaders
Jakub Zygmunt Rybiński; Ludwik Konstanty Pociej	Józef Potocki

Strength
10,000 men	10,000 men

Casualties and losses
200 killed, unknown number of wounded	380 killed, 1,000 wounded, 2,000 captured
- Location within Silesian Voivodeship Battle of Koniecpol (Poland)

The Battle of Koniecpol was an encounter in November 1708 during the Great Northern War.

== History ==
Near Koniecpol in the Polish–Lithuanian Commonwealth, pro-Swedish forces under Stanisław Leszczyński of the Warsaw Confederation met with anti-Swedish forces of the Sandomierz Confederation, loyal to Augustus the Strong and allied with Russia. Both armies had a strength of about 10,000 men.

The anti-Swedish Sandomierz Confederation won. Leszczyński was defeated, and thus unable to aid Charles XII of Sweden in the Russian campaign. The Warsaw Confederation would soon collapse, and the Sandomierz Confederation would reunite the Commonwealth under the reign of Augustus.
