= 1702 in Russia =

- Decades: 1680s; 1690s; 1700s; 1710s; 1720s
- See also: History of Russia; Timeline of Russian history; List of years in Russia

This article lists events that took place in Russia in 1702 and after it.

Events from the year 1702 in Russia

== Incumbents ==
- Monarch – Peter I

== Events ==
- Zlynka - A small town established in Bryansk Oblast, near the border of Belarus. It primarily consisted of Old Believers, which influenced its architecture and religion. The town's location made it ideal for creating cultural diversity.
- Siege of Nöteborg- It was one of the first sieges of the Great Northern War, when Russian forces captured the Swedish fortress of Nöteborg in October 1702.
- Beginning development of the Kremlin Arsenal in 1702 which finished in 1736 due to lack of funding at that time.
- Battle of Hummelshof - It was the second significant Russian victory in the Great Northern War. Started in July 1702
