= 1708 in Russia =

- Decades: 1680s; 1690s; 1700s; 1710s; 1720s
- See also: History of Russia; Timeline of Russian history; List of years in Russia

Events from the year 1708 in Russia

== Incumbents ==
- Monarch – Peter I

== Events ==
- Archangelgorod Governorate
- Kazan Governorate
- Moscow Governorate
- Saint Petersburg Governorate
- Siberia Governorate
- Smolensk Governorate

== Births ==
- 7 February [O.S. 27 January] 1708 - Grand Duchess Anna Petrovna of Russia, Elder daughter of Emperor Peter I, the Great of Russia and his wife Empress Catherine I. (d. 1728)
