= 1707 in Russia =

- Decades: 1680s; 1690s; 1700s; 1710s; 1720s
- See also: History of Russia; Timeline of Russian history; List of years in Russia

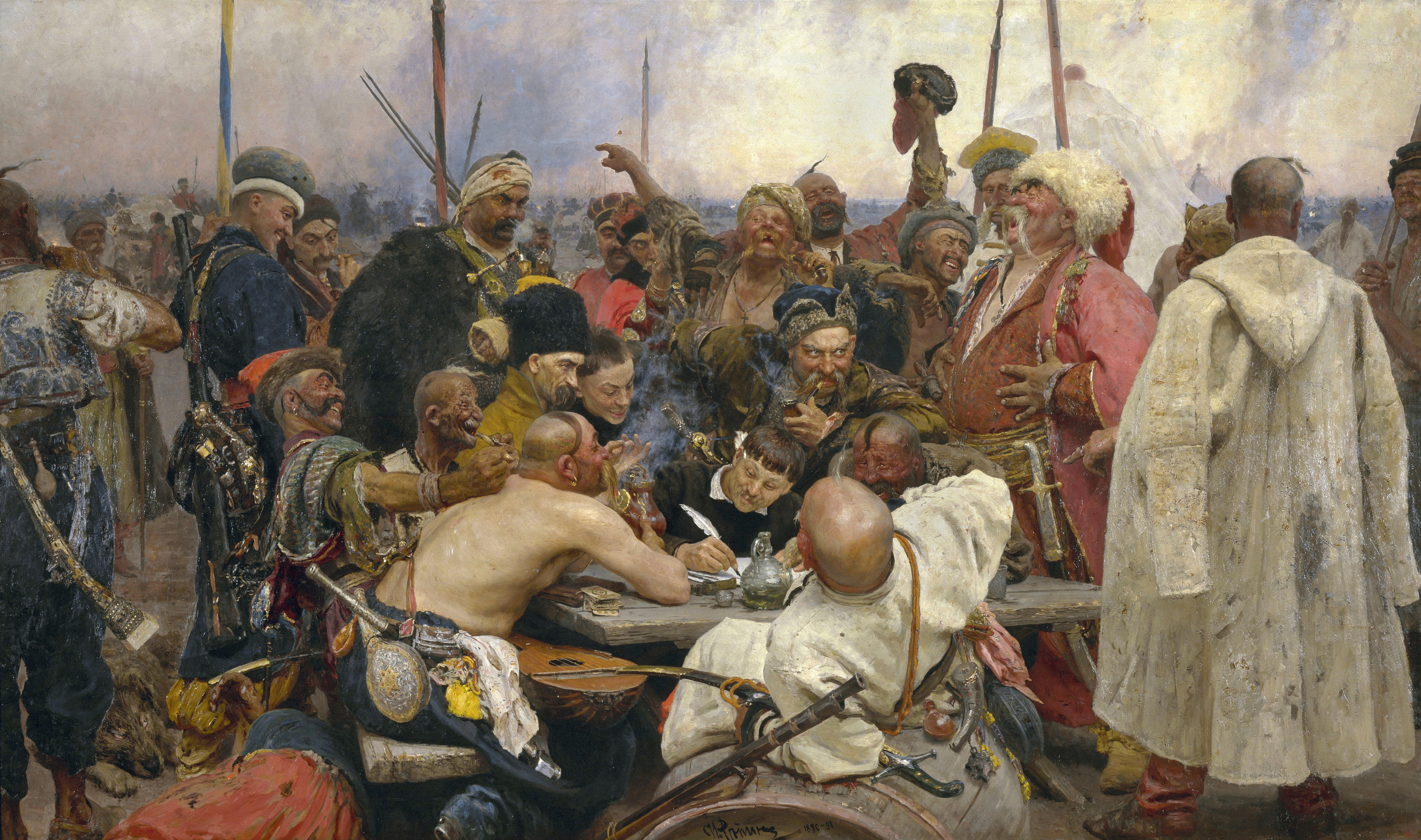
Ilja Jefimowitsch Repin 009

Events from the year 1707 in Russia:

== Incumbents ==
- Monarch – Peter I

== Events ==
- Bulavin Rebellion

== Births ==
- Feodor Vassilyev, man with the most children off a single wife.
