= 1700 in Russia =

- Decades: 1680s; 1690s; 1700s; 1710s; 1720s
- See also: History of Russia; Timeline of Russian history; List of years in Russia

Events from the year 1700 in Russia

== Incumbents ==
- Monarch – Peter I

== Events ==
- 13 July - Treaty of Constantinople, Russian tsardom relieved from paying the annual tribute to the Crimean Khanate paid since the occupation of Muscovy by the Golden Horde.
- 30 November - Battle of Narva, an early battle in the Great Northern War where a Russian siege force was defeated by a Swedish relief army under Charles XII of Sweden.

== Births ==
- Anastasija Trubetskaya, courtier (died 1755)

== Deaths ==
- 30 March - Peter Artemiev, converted to catholicism
- 12 February - Aleksei Shein, commander and statesman
- 16 October - Patriarch Adrian, Patriarch of Moscow and all Rus'
- Pyotr Potemkin - a Russian diplomat and courtier
