= 1703 in Russia =

- Decades: 1680s; 1690s; 1700s; 1710s; 1720s
- See also: History of Russia; Timeline of Russian history; List of years in Russia

Events from the year 1703 in Russia

== Incumbents ==
- Monarch – Peter I

== Events ==
- 21 April – Battle of Pultusk; Charles XII wins the Battle of Pultusk during the invasion of Poland and Lithuania.
- 27 May – Tsar Peter the Great founds Saint Petersburg on the site of a captured Swedish fortress, naming it after the apostle Saint Peter.

=== Undated ===
- Polish Sejm raise Polish and Lithuanian armies against Russia to 36,000 and 12,000 men respectively.
- Peter the Great assaults and captures the island fortress of Nöteborg, renaming it Shlisselburg.

=== Ongoing ===
- Great Northern War

== Births ==
- March 5 - Vasily Trediakovsky
- December 24 - Aleksei Chirikov
