= 1706 in Russia =

- Decades: 1680s; 1690s; 1700s; 1710s; 1720s
- See also: History of Russia; Timeline of Russian history; List of years in Russia

Events from the year 1706 in Russia

== Incumbents ==
- Monarch – Peter I was the tsar

== Events ==
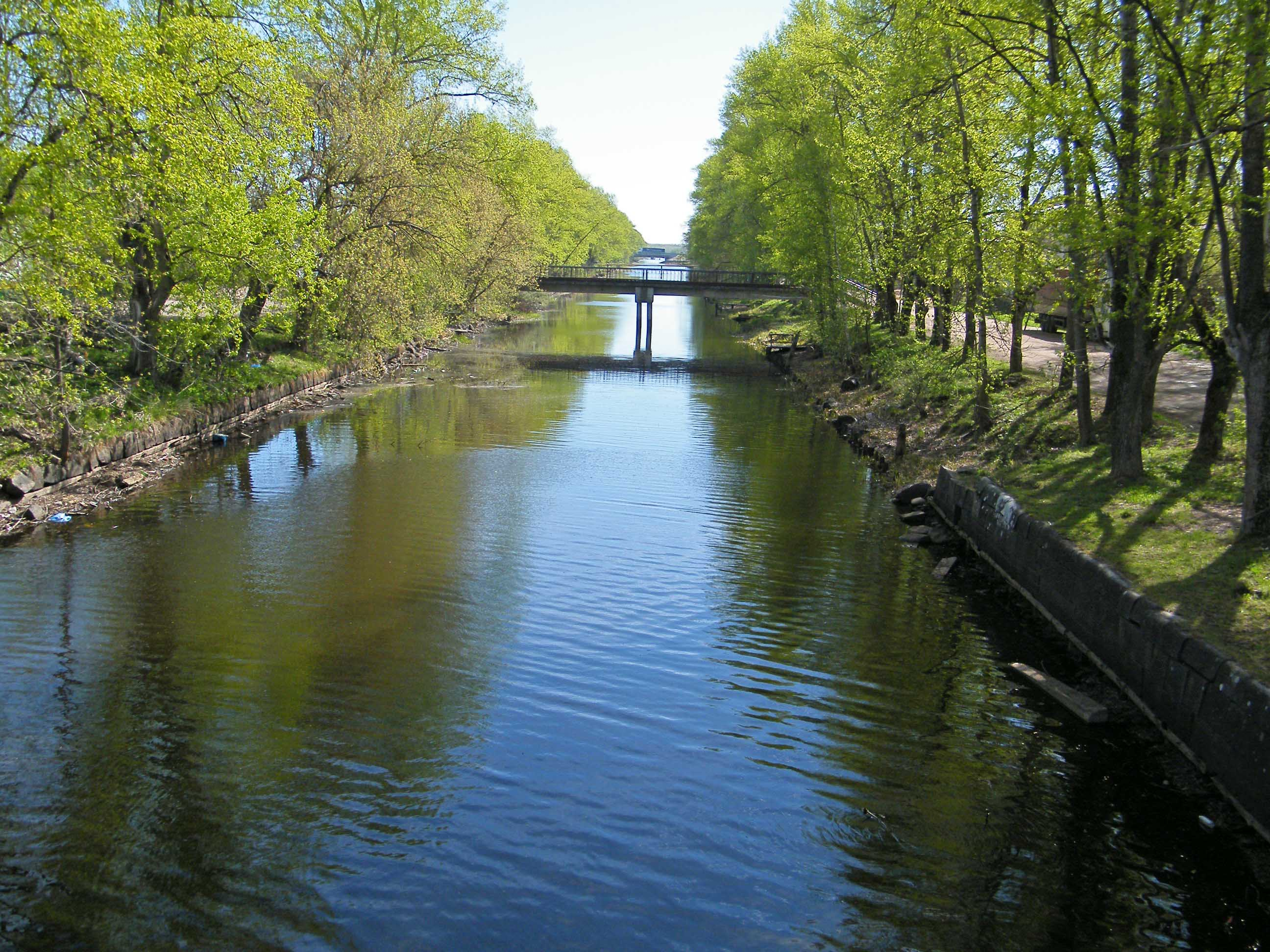
Image of Vyshny Volochyok Waterway, modern day.

- Vyshny Volochyok Waterway was under construction
- Campaign of Grodno was ongoing
- Battle of Grodno took place from the 26th of January - the 10th of April in modern-day Belarus.
- Battle of Fraustadt took place from the 2nd-13th of February in modern-day Wschowa, Poland.
- Battle of Valkininkai took place on the 6th of March in Valkininkai, Lithuania.
- Battle of Kletsk took place on the 30th of April in modern-day Belarus.

== Deaths ==
- Tatyana Mikhailovna died on the 23rd of August
