= Capitulation of Estonia and Livonia =

1710 integration of the Swedish dominions of Estonia and Latvia into the Russian Empire

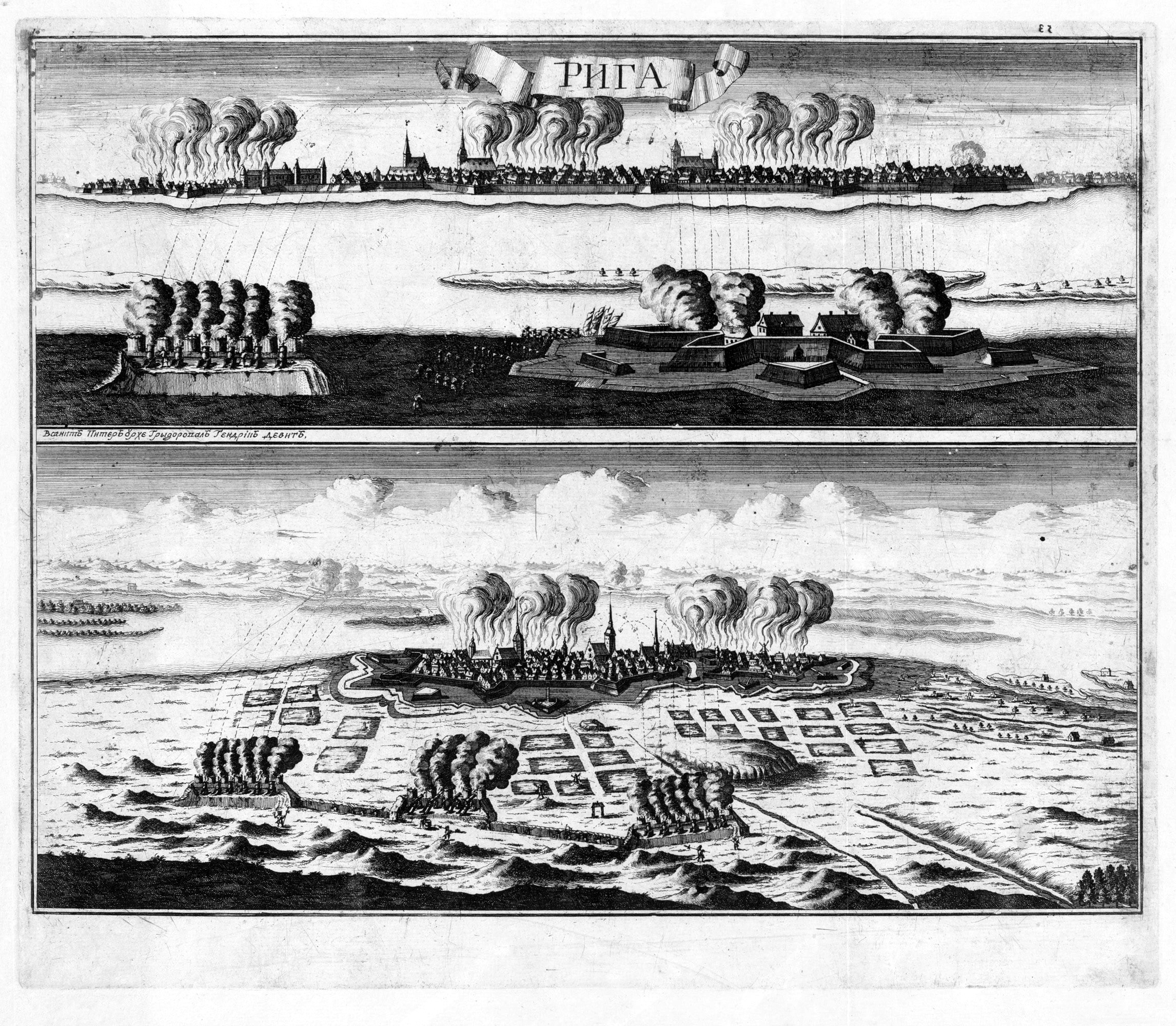
- Siege of Riga (1710)
- Drafted: 15 July – 10 October 1710 (N.S.)
- Location: Riga, Pernau, Reval
- Parties: Estonian and Livonian nobles and major cities; Russia
- Language: German

With the Capitulation of Estonia and Livonia in 1710 the Swedish dominions Estonia and Livonia were integrated into the Russian Empire following their conquest during the Great Northern War. The Livonian nobility and the city of Riga capitulated on 4 July (O.S.) / 15 July 1710 (N.S.), Pernau (Pärnu) in August, and the Estonian nobility and the city of Reval (Tallinn) on 29 September (O.S.) / 10 October (N.S.). Russia left the local institutions in place and confirmed the traditional privileges of the German nobles and burghers as was established in Privilegium Sigismundi Augusti, especially with respect to the Protestant faith. The land reform of the so-called reduction which had been introduced by the Swedish king Charles XI, and transformed many serfs to subjects of the Crown, was reversed.

The Swedish Empire formally accepted the capitulations in the Treaty of Nystad in 1721. The transfer of the Baltic provinces marked the end of Sweden's and the beginning of Russia's time as a great power. The Baltic provinces retained their special status until the late 19th century.

== Background ==
In the pretext of the Great Northern War, August the Strong of Saxe-Poland-Lithuania and Peter the Great of Russia had agreed to conquer and partition Sweden's Baltic dominions in the Treaty of Preobrazhenskoye in 1699. During the war, Charles XII of Sweden was able to defeat the Russian army at Narva in 1700, and then pursued August the Strong to Saxony. Once the main Swedish army was gone, Russian forces were able to regroup and conquered most of the plague-stricken Baltic provinces until 1710, when the last Swedish strongholds Riga, Reval and Pernau capitulated. At this time, the main Swedish army was captured at the Surrender at Perevolochna following the Battle of Poltava. Peter the Great had in person launched the first shells in the siege of Riga, in November 1709.

== Terms ==
In the Estonian and Livonian capitulations, Russia largely confirmed local law and privileges, especially the Protestant church order, thus granting administrative, economical, social and cultural autonomy. This included laws and privileges dating back to the Teutonic Order State and, in Estonia, Danish laws. (Note: Capitulation of Reval, first paragraph, excerpt: "[...] dasz von Ihro Grosz Czarischen Maytt. vor sich und ihren hohen Successoren ihnen allen von denen Königen in Dänemarck, denen Hoch Meistern, Herren Meistern, Königen in Schweden von Zeiten zu Zeiten der Stadt und ihren Einwohnern gegebene privilegia, pacta, Immunitäten, Freyheiten alle wohl hergebrachte christlöbl. Gewohnheiten, Königl. Resolutiones in genere und in specie sowohl in spiritualibus als temporalibus werden confirmiret, und zu allen Zeiten nach dem Wortverstande ohne einige andere Deutung fest gehalten werden." Luts (2006), p. 162.) (Note: Capitulation of the Livonian nobles, tenth paragraph, excerpt: "In allen gerichten wird nach Liefländischen Privilegien wohl eingeführten Gewohnheiten, auch nach dem bekannten alten Lief-Ländischen Ritterrechte, und, wo diese deficieren möchten, nach gemeinen Teutschen Rechten, dem landesüblichen Processform gemäss [...] decidiert [...]" Luts (2006), p. 160.) (Note: Capitulation of the Estonian nobles, second paragraph, excerpt: "Alle Privilegia, Donationes, Statuten, Immunitäten, Alte wohlhergebrachte Landes Gewohnheiten von deren Glorwürdigsten Königen in Dennemark, item denen Hoch- vnd Herr Meistern dem Lande und Adel gegebene und von Zeiten zu Zeiten confirmirte Praerogativen, wie Selbe in Ihrem tenore von Wort zu Wort lauten, zu confirmiren und zuerhalten." Luts (2006), p. 161.) The reduction of these privileges by Swedish absolutism had caused exiled Livonian noble and spokesman of the Livonian nobles Johann Reinhold von Patkul to successfully lobby for war against Sweden in the pretext of the war, and their confirmation was to assure loyalty of the Baltic elites, who in the majority had fiercely resisted Russian conquest, to the tsar. The capitulations were concluded exclusively by the Baltic German burghers and noble class, the Estonian and Latvian speaking population was not mentioned.

The confirmation of local law and administration resulted in many Swedish laws and decrees remaining in effect under Russian rule. For example, an incomplete list of 122 still effective Swedish decrees was published in Reval in 1777, and the Swedish ecclesiastical order was only replaced in 1832.

The capitulation of Livonia violated August the Strong's claims as outlined in the Treaty of Preobrazhenskoye (1699) and renewed on 9–10 October (O.S.) / 20–21 October 1709 (N.S.) in the Treaty of Thorn. When in these treaties the allies had partitioned the Swedish dominions among themselves, August was to gain Livonia. Ignoring Gerhard Johann von Löwenwolde's urge to heed these treaties, Boris Sheremetev had the Livonians swear allegiance to Peter the Great. Löwenwolde, formerly serving August the Strong, was made Peter's plenipotentiary in Livonia and held that office until 1713.

== Consequences ==
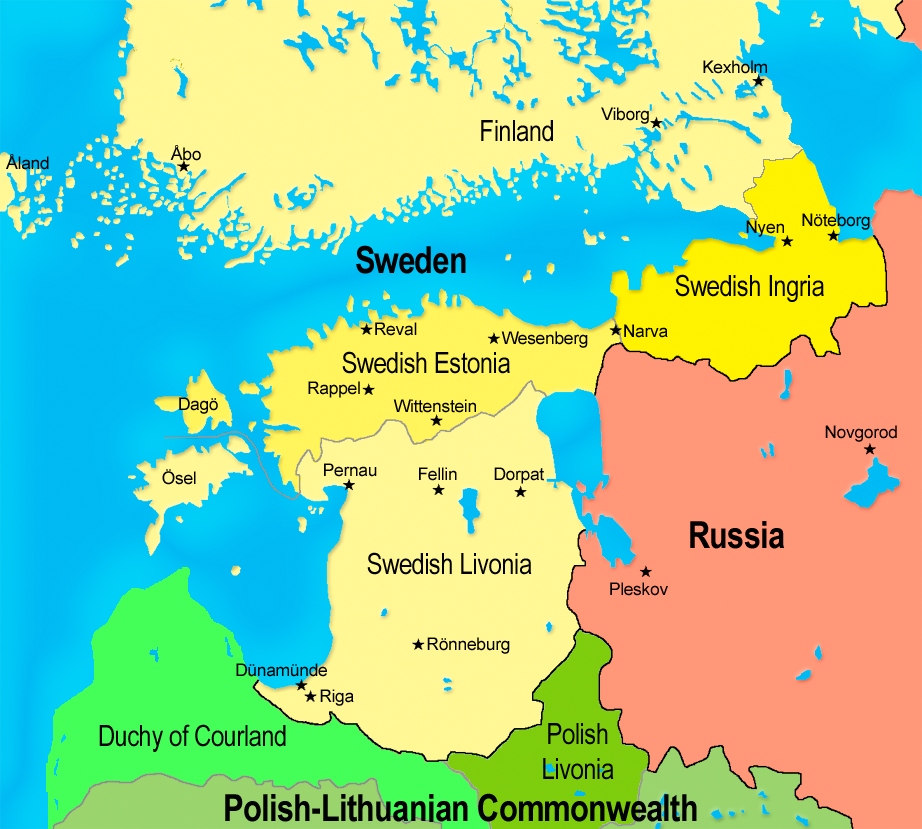
The Baltic provinces before 1710/1721

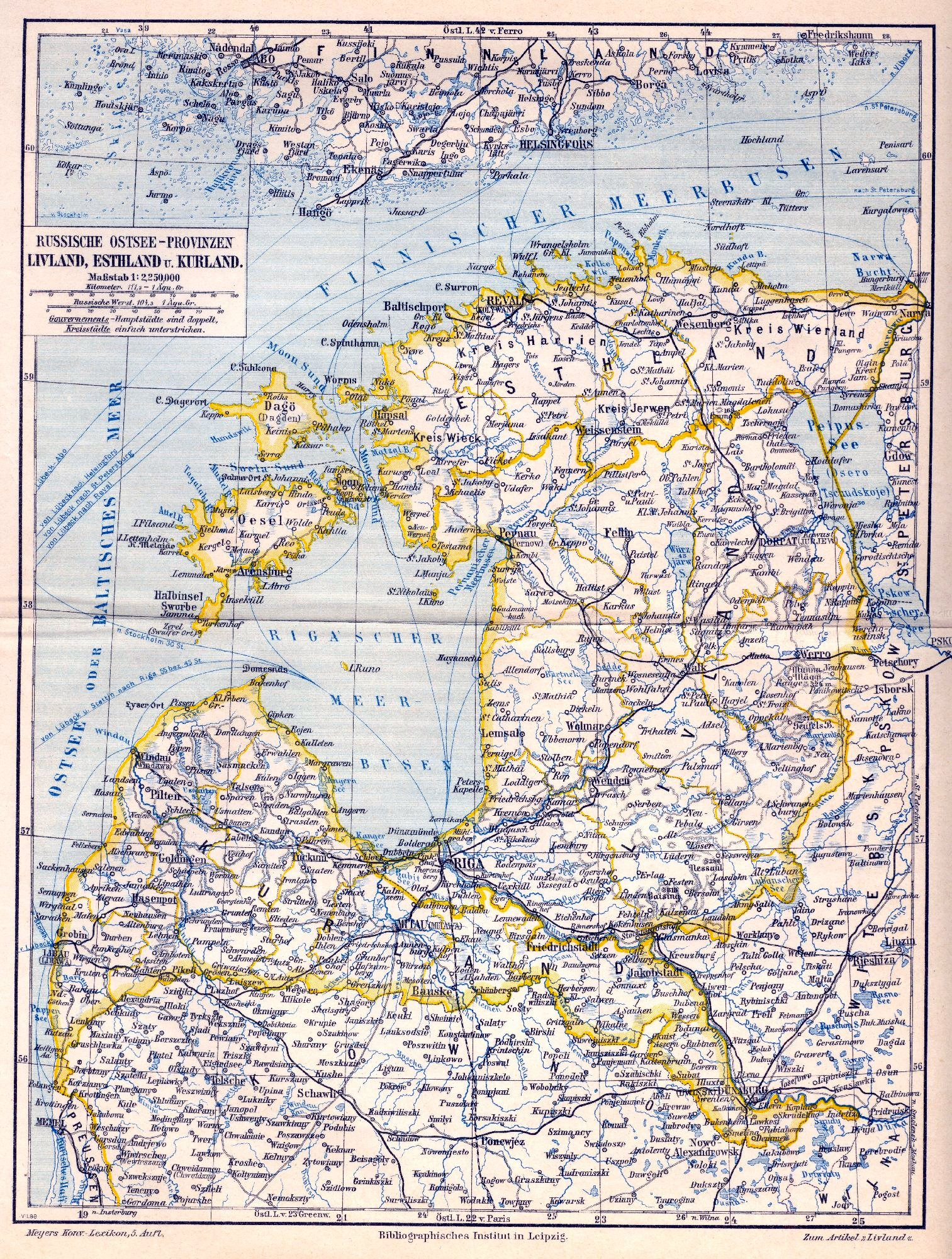
The Russian Baltic governorates Riga/Livonia and Estonia (established 1713) and Courland (established 1795)

Before the Swedish-Russian hostilities were concluded in Nystad (1721), the Swedish government did not accept the capitulation. Swedish intelligence operated in the occupied areas and interrogated people who escaped from these provinces to Sweden proper. In 1711 and 1712, Swedish naval units made several landfalls on the Estonian coast, burning villages and estates. Greater expeditions were planned during the same time, including a naval assault on Ösel (Saaremaa) in 1711 and a subsequent landfall with all Swedish troops stationed in Finland, but these plans were not executed. The last plan for a military recovery of the Baltic provinces was made in 1720, but this one too was not executed. The Swedish government further maintained an exiled administration of the Baltic dominions, and assigned vacant administrative positions until 1720. The Russian administration, under supreme command of Boris Sheremetev, reacted by prohibiting contacts of the local population to Sweden.

On 30 August 1721, the Treaty of Nystad formalized Russia's acquisition of the Baltic provinces and the respective capitulations in articles IX, X, XI and XII. Sweden had to relinquish her claims "forever", and strike the provinces from the royal title. Peter the Great in turn changed his title from tsar to imperator, and amended it with kniaz Estlandskyi, Livlandskyi i Korelskyi, i.e. duke of Estonia, Livonia and Karelia. However, reconquest of her former Baltic dominions remained a Swedish war aim in the century following the Great Northern War, since these territories were of high strategic importance and Livonia had been a major Swedish source for grain. Yet, none of the respective attempts during the Russo-Swedish wars of 1741–1743, 1788–1790 and 1808–1809 was successful. As Loit (2004) put it:

It was the acquisition of Estonia in the year of 1561, which marked the first step to Sweden's emergence as a European great power, and it was when the Baltic provinces were lost to Russia in 1710 (1721), during the Northern War, that Sweden was transformed into a second-class power again. (Note: "Es war die Inbesitznahme Estlands im Jahre 1561, die den ersten Schritt auf dem Weg Schwedens zu einer europäischen Großmacht bildete, und es war der Verlust der baltischen Ostseeprovinzen an Rußland 1710 (1721), der Schweden wieder in eine Macht zweiten Ranges verwandelte." Loit (2004), p. 69.)

The acquisition of Estonia and Livonia introduced a new class of Baltic German nobles to Russian courts. During the following centuries, Baltic Germans were to occupy important positions in the Russian Empire. In 1795, Early Modern Russia completed her Baltic expansion with the acquisition of Courland by a capitulation similar to the Estonian and Livonian ones, following the Third Partition of the Polish-Lithuanian Commonwealth. The Baltic provinces retained their special status within the Russian Empire until tsar Nicholas I started to implement Russification policies in the 1840s. Between 1883 and 1905, under tsar Alexander III, nationalist policies resulted in changes in administration and education, before the 1905 Russian Revolution eased the situation. While after the conquest of the Baltic provinces Peter the Great had guaranteed that the German language retained its status as official language, Catherine II had introduced Russian as second official language, and in the 1880s, Russian was introduced as the second lingua franca.

== Bibliography ==
- Bushkovitch, Paul (2001). Peter the Great. The struggle for power, 1671–1725. New studies in European history. Cambridge University Press. ISBN 0-521-80585-6.
- Dauchert, Helge (2006). "Anwalt der Balten" oder Anwalt in eigener Sache?. The Baltic Sea region. Northern dimensions – European perspectives (in German). Vol. 11. Berlin: Berliner Wissenschaftsverlag. ISBN 3-8305-1567-7.
- Frost, Robert I (2000). The Northern Wars. War, State and Society in Northeastern Europe 1558–1721. Harlow: Longman. ISBN 978-0-582-06429-4.
- Hatlie, Mark R. (2005). "Crisis and Mass Conversion. Russian Orthodox Missions in Livonia, 1841–1917". In Keul, István (ed.). Religion, Ethnie, Nation und die Aushandlung von Identität(en). Regionale Religionsgeschichte in Ostmittel- und Südosteuropa. Frank & Timme Verlag für wissenschaftliche Literatur. pp. 115–146. ISBN 3-86596-009-X.
- Kappeler, Andreas (2008). Rußland als Vielvölkerreich. Entstehung, Geschichte, Zerfall. Beck'sche Reihe (in German). Vol. 1447 (2 ed.). Munich: C.H.Beck. ISBN 978-3-406-57739-0.
- Koch, Kristine (2002). Deutsch als Fremdsprache im Russland des 18. Jahrhunderts. Die Geschichte des Deutschen als Fremdsprache (in German). Vol. 1. Berlin/New York: Walter de Gruyter. ISBN 3-11-017503-7.
- Loit, Aleksander (2005). "Das Balitkum in der Außenpolitik Schwedens im 18.-20. Jahrhundert. Eine Übersicht". In Angermann, Norbert; Garleff, Michael; Lenz, Wilhelm (eds.). Ostseeprovinzen, Baltische Staaten und das Nationale. Festschrift für Gert von Pistohlkors zum 70. Geburtstag. Schriften der Baltischen Historischen Kommission (in German). Vol. 14. Münster: LIT. pp. 69–88. ISBN 3-8258-9086-4.
- Luts, Marju (2006). "Modernisierung und deren Hemmnisse in den Ostseeprovinzen Est-, Liv- und Kurland im 19. Jahrhundert. Verfassungsrechtlicher Rahmen der Rechtsordnung. Die Kapitulationen von 1710 und 1795". In Giaro, Tomasz (ed.). Rechtskulturen des modernen Osteuropa. Traditionen und Transfers. Volume 1. Ius Commune. Studien zur europäischen Rechtsgeschichte (in German). Vol. 205. Modernisierung durch Transfer im 19. und frühen 20. Jahrhundert. Frankfurt am Main: Klostermann. pp. 159–200. ISBN 3-465-03489-9.
