= Battle of Hogland (1705) =

1705 battle

- Part of Great Northern War
Date	20 August 1705
Location	Near Hogland Island, Gulf of Finland
Result	Swedish victory

Belligerents
Swedish Navy	Imperial Russian Navy

Commanders and leaders
Cornelius Ankarstierna	unknown

Strength
1 ship of the line	7 galleys

The battle of Hogland 1705 was a minor naval battle between the Swedish ship of the line Reval and 7 Russian galleys. After several hours of fighting, the Swedes were victorious. It was the first time that Russian galleys took part in a naval battle in the Baltic Sea.

== Sources ==
- Ehrensvärd, Ulla; Kokkonen, Pellervo; Nurminen, Juha (1995). Mare Balticum : 2000 år av östersjöns historia [2000 years of history of the Baltic Sea] (in Swedish). ISBN 9511139932.
