= Treaty of Narva =

1704 treaty between Russia and Poland–Lithuania

- Type: Alliance
- Signed: 30 August 1704
- Location: Narva
- Parties: Tsardom of Russia; Polish-Lithuanian Commonwealth (Sandomierz Confederation)
- Language: Russian

The Treaty of Narva was concluded on 19 August (O.S.) / 30 August 1704 during the Great Northern War. The faction of the Polish–Lithuanian Commonwealth loyal to Augustus the Strong joined the anti-Swedish alliance between the Saxon electorate and the Tsardom of Russia.

== Background ==
At the onset of the Great Northern War, Augustus the Strong was king of Poland, Grand Duke of Lithuania and Elector of Saxony. In 1699, he allied with the Russian tsar Peter the Great in the Treaty of Preobrazhenskoye and with Frederik IV of Denmark-Norway in the Treaty of Dresden. The alliances provided the basis for a combined attack on the Swedish Empire, which followed in 1700. Already in 1700, Denmark was forced to withdraw and Russia suffered a decisive defeat. In the following years, Charles XII of Sweden pursued Augustus through Poland–Lithuania, imposing on him a series of defeats, and Russia was able to recover and advance in the Baltic provinces. The Lithuanian magnates abandoned Augustus in April 1702 and allied with Sweden.

In July 1704, Swedish advances and the resulting internal quarrels in Poland–Lithuania caused the dethronement of Augustus the Strong and election of Stanisław Leszczyński, the candidate promoted by the Charles XII of Sweden, as the Polish king. However, Augustus the Strong still enjoyed support in the Polish–Lithuanian Commonwealth, particularly by the Sandomierz Confederation and about 75% of the Polish army. In the name of the commonwealth, Augustus and his supporters declared war on Sweden and joined the anti-Swedish coalition at Narva.

== Terms ==
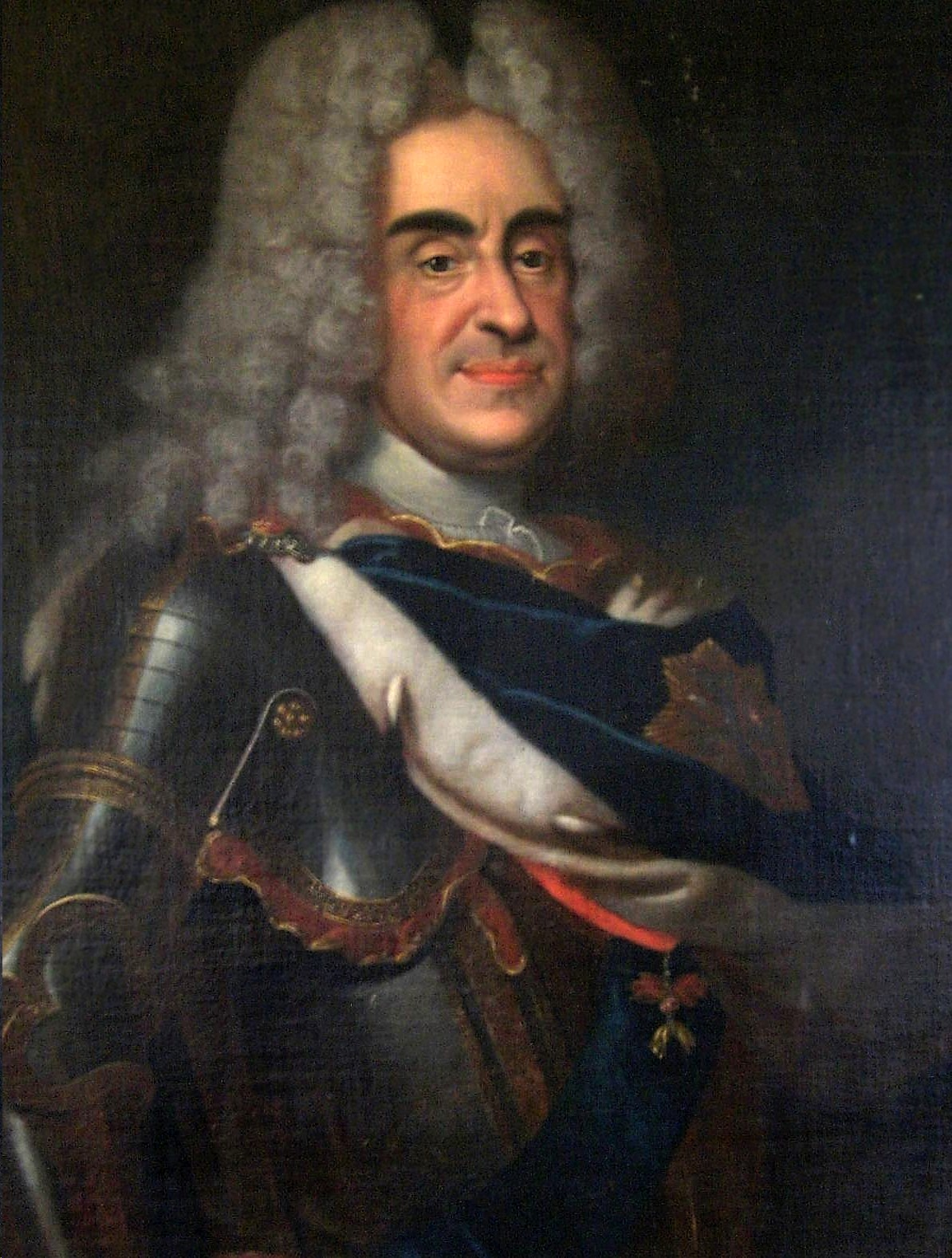
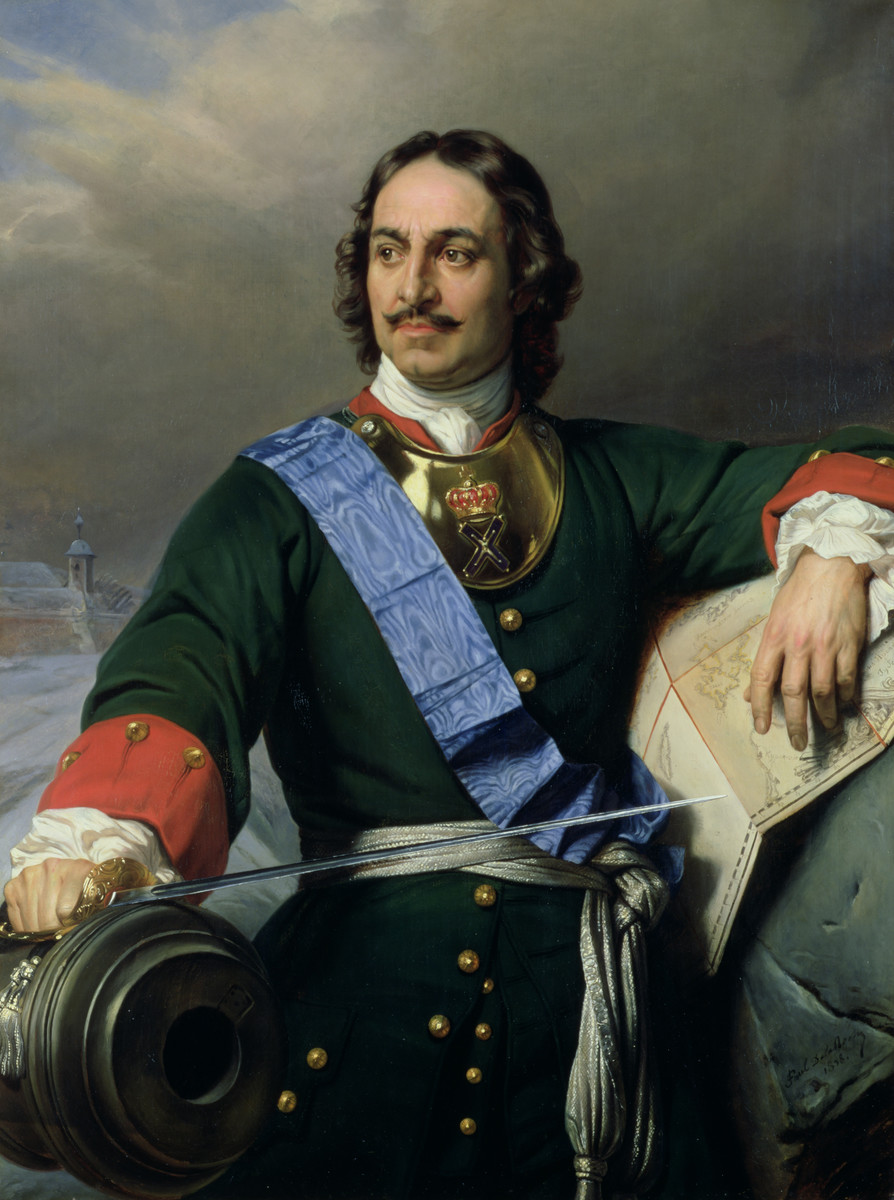
Augustus the Strong (left) and Peter the Great (right)

The treaty was negotiated for Poland by Thomas Dzialynski (Dzialin), a commander of the Saxo-Polish forces participating in the preceding Russian siege and storm of Narva. The treaty was signed by Peter the Great of Russia, Augustus the Strong and Polish-Lithuanian magnates.

The alliance was both defensive and offensive. The treaty ruled that Poland and Russia were both to continue the war and to sign no treaties without mutual consent. Peter the Great was to grant August the Strong 200,000 rubles annual subsidies, maintain 12,000 troops, and return Semen Paliy's conquests in Ukraine and Russian conquests in Livonia.

== Consequences ==
Peter the Great had thus ensured that the Polish-Lithuanian theatre would continue to bind Swedish forces. Most notably, reinforcements for Charles XII's Russian campaign were cut off in the Battle of Koniecpol. To pay the agreed on subsidies, a monetary tax was raised from the peasantry.

For Augustus, the treaty was favourable, as his position had deteriorated from his numerous defeats by Swedish armies. Peter the Great, in pursuit of the treaty, ordered Ivan Mazepa to expel Paliy (Paley) from the commonwealth's cossack territories, which he eventually did, Dzialinsky's irrefutable condition during the negotiations. However, Russian "helpful occupation" of Livonia would result not in the anticipated handover but instead in integration into the Russian Empire.

The faction of the Polish–Lithuanian Commonwealth loyal to Stanisław Leszczyński, organised in the Warsaw Confederation, instead concluded an alliance with the Swedish Empire in the Treaty of Warsaw in November 1705.

== Sources ==
=== Bibliography ===
- Anisimov, Evgeniĭ Viktorovich (1993). The reforms of Peter the Great. Progress through coercion in Russia. The New Russian history. M.E. Sharpe. ISBN 1-56324-047-5.
- Bromley, J. S. (1970). Rise of Great Britain & Russia, 1688-1725. The New Cambridge Modern History. Vol. 6. CUP Archive. ISBN 0-521-07524-6.
- Donnert, Erich; Mühlpfordt, Günter (1997). Europa in der Frühen Neuzeit: Festschrift für Günter Mühlpfordt. Aufbruch zur Moderne (in German). Vol. 3. Böhlau. ISBN 3-412-00697-1.
- Frost, Robert I (2000). The Northern Wars. War, State and Society in Northeastern Europe 1558-1721. Harlow: Longman. ISBN 978-0-582-06429-4.
- Schuyler, Eugene (2004). Peter the Great. Vol. 2 (reprint ed.). Kessinger Publishing. ISBN 1-4179-7143-6.
- Wróbel, Piotr; Kozicki, Richard J., eds. (1996). Historical dictionary of Poland, 966-1945. Greenwood Publishing Group. ISBN 0-313-26007-9.
