= Andrey Matveyev (painter) =

Russian portrait painter (1701–1739)

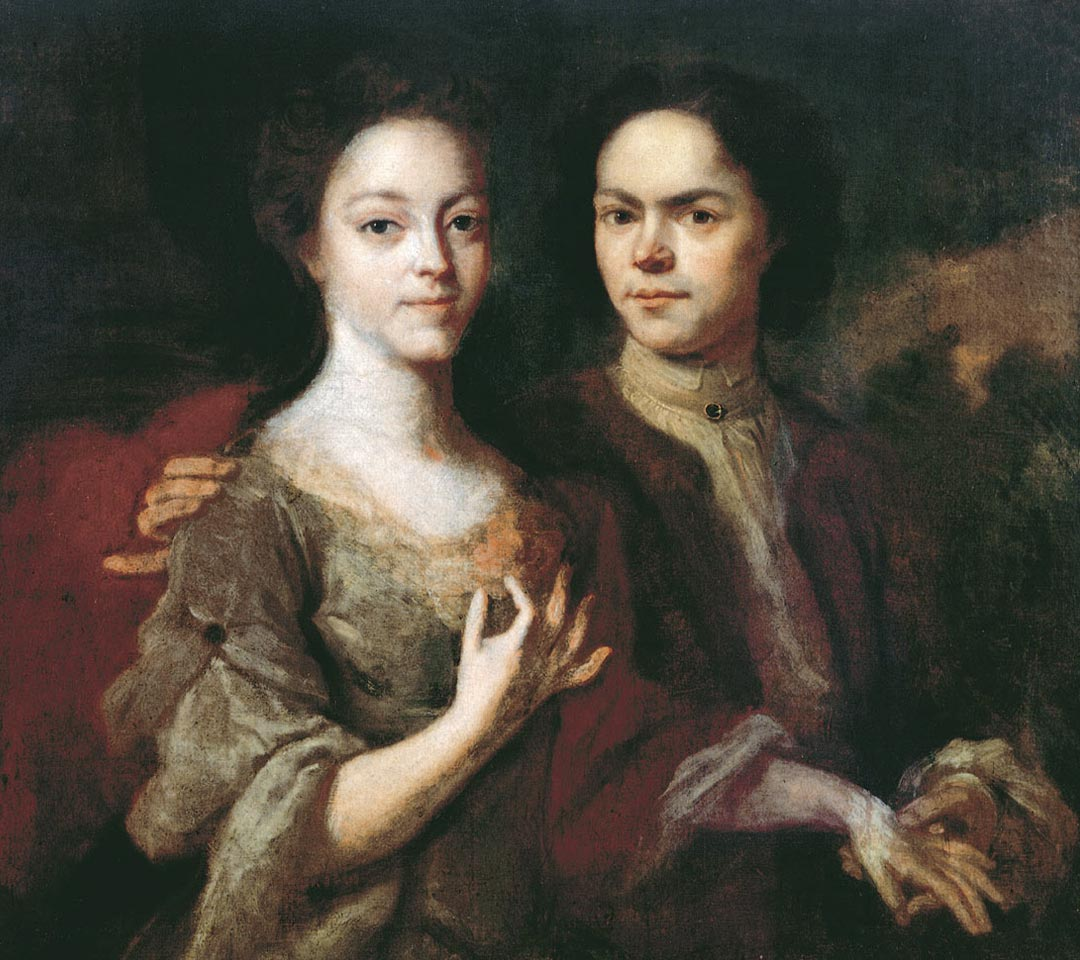
Self-portrait with Wife (1729)

Andrey Matveyev (Russian: Андрей Матвеевич Матвеев. 1701 – 23 April 1739) was a Russian artist. He was one of that nation's earliest modern-style portrait painters and helped to establish the genre.

== Biography ==
He was born in Novgorod in 1701 but the names of his parents are unknown.

Peter the Great, having somehow become acquainted and impressed with Matveyev's early work, sent him to study in Europe. Beginning in 1716, he spent eleven years in the Netherlands and Flanders where he worked under Carel de Moor. From 1723-1727 he attended the Royal Academy of Fine Arts (Antwerp). He was the first Russian artist taught entirely outside of Russia.

In 1727, he returned home, where he became the Chief Artist at the Court in Saint Petersburg. From c.1731, he was the head of a team of painters who worked on several architectural projects, including interiors at the Peter and Paul Cathedral and a triumphal arch in honor of Empress Anna Ivanovna. His early death is believed to be the result of his heavy work load.

His most often reproduced work is a self-portrait with his wife. There is an alternative version of the painting, also attributed to Matveyev, which has been identified as Duke Anthony Ulrich of Brunswick with Anna Leopoldovna.

He died in Saint Petersburg.
