= 1714 in Russia =

Events from the year 1714 in Russia

== Incumbents ==
- Monarch – Peter I

== Events ==
- February 28 – (February 17 old style) Russia's Tsar Peter the Great issues a decree requiring compulsory education in mathematics for children of government officials and nobility, applying to children between the ages of 10 and 15 years old.
- March 2 – (February 19 old style) The Battle of Storkyro is fought between troops of the Swedish Empire and the Russian Empire, near what is now the village of Napue in Finland. The outnumbered Swedish forces, under the command of General Carl Gustaf Armfeldt, suffer 1,600 troops killed in action while the Russians led by General Mikhail Golitsyn lose 400 men.
- July 27 – The Imperial Russian Navy gains its first important victory against the Swedish Navy in the Battle of Gangut.
- September 29 – The Great Hatred: the Cossacks of the Russian Empire kill about 800 people overnight on the Finnish island of Hailuoto.

== Births ==
- Natalia Sheremeteva (d. 1771)
- March 1 – Alexander Alexandrovich Menshikov (d. November 27, 1764)
- July 12 – Mikhail Illarionovich Vorontsov (d. February 15, 1767)
- July 21 – Grand Duchess Natalya Alexeyevna of Russia (1714–1728) (d. November 22, 1728)

== Deaths ==
- Vasily Golitsyn (born 1643)
- Boris Alekseyevich Golitsyn (born 1654)
- May 18 – Ivan Botsis
- August 15 – Anna Mons (born January 1, 1672)
