= Johann Patkul =

Baltic German noble and politician (1660–1707)

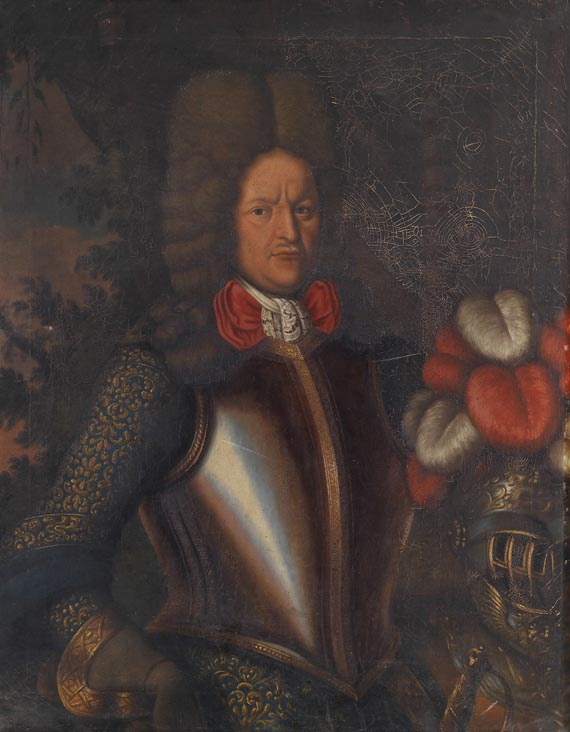
Portrait, 1700s

Johann Reinhold Patkul (27 July 1660 – 10 October 1707) was a Livonian nobleman, politician and agitator of Baltic German extraction. Born as a subject to the Swedish Crown, he protested against the manner of King Charles XI of Sweden's reduction in Livonia, enraging the king, who had him arrested and sentenced to mutilation and death (1694). Patkul fled from the Swedish Empire to continental Europe, and played a key role in the secret diplomacy (1698–1699) allying Peter I of Russia, Augustus II the Strong of Saxony and the Polish–Lithuanian Commonwealth - as well as Christian V and his successor Frederick IV of Denmark–Norway - against Charles XII of Sweden, triggering the Great Northern War of 1700–1721.

Patkul was close friends with the Danish Privy Councillor Knud Thott, who had been driven away from his home province Scania during the Scanian War. During the 1690s and early 1700s the two of them worked actively for Danish intervention against Sweden so that Livonia and Scania might be freed from Swedish overlordship. During the first war years, Patkul retained a key role in the communication between the allies and other European courts, holding positions at king Augustus's court first in Augustus's interests (1698–1700), then in tsar Peter's service. In late 1705 Patkul fell from Augustus's favor and was arrested and charged with high treason. Throughout the following year he was detained first in Sonnenstein, then in Königstein (both in Saxony), before Charles XII forced Augustus to extradite him by the Treaty of Altranstädt in late 1706. Patkul spent another year in Swedish detention before Charles XII had him broken on the wheel and decapitated.

== Youth ==
Patkul was born in prison at Stockholm, where his father had been imprisoned under suspicion of treason. He entered the Swedish Army at an early age and was subsequently promoted captain.

== Dispute over reduction ==
In 1689, at the head of a deputation of Livonian gentry, he went to Stockholm to protest against the rigour with which the land-recovery project of Charles XI of Sweden was being carried out in his native province. His eloquence impressed Charles XI, but his representations were disregarded. When he submitted another petition in more offensive language to the king three years later, his renewed complaints involved him in a government prosecution. To save himself from the penalties of high treason, Patkul fled from Stockholm to Switzerland, and was condemned in absentia to lose his right hand and his head. His estates were at the same time confiscated.

== Role in planning the Great Northern War ==
For the next four years, Patkul led a vagabond life, but in 1698, after vainly petitioning the new king, Charles XII of Sweden, for pardon, he entered the service of Augustus II the Strong of Saxony and Poland, with the deliberate intention of wresting Livonia from Sweden, to which he had now no hope of returning so long as that province belonged to the Swedish Crown. The aristocratic republic of Poland was obviously the most convenient suzerain for a Livonian nobleman; so in 1698, Patkul proceeded to the court of the king-elector at Dresden and bombarded Augustus with proposals for the partition of Sweden. His first plan was a combination against her of Saxony, Denmark and Brandenburg; but, Brandenburg failing him, he was obliged very unwillingly to admit Russia into the partnership.

The tsar was to be content with Ingria and Estonia while Augustus was to take Livonia, nominally as a fief of Poland, but really as a hereditary possession of the Saxon house. Military operations against Sweden's Baltic provinces were to be begun simultaneously by the Saxons and Russians. After thus forging the first link of the partition treaty, Patkul proceeded to Moscow, and, at a secret conference held at Preobrazhenskoye, easily persuaded Peter the Great to accede to the league on 18 November 1699.

== In Saxon and Russian service ==
Throughout the earlier, unluckier days of the Great Northern War, Patkul was the mainstay of the confederates. At Vienna, in 1702, he picked up the Scottish general George Benedict Ogilvie, and enlisted him in Peter's service.

The same year, recognizing the unprofitableness of serving such a master as Augustus, he exchanged the Saxon for the Russian service. Peter was glad enough to get a man so famous for his talents and energy, but Patkul speedily belied his reputation. His knowledge was too local and limited. In February 1703, Patkul was sent to Bila Tserkva to negotiate with Semen Paliy on the tsar's behalf, but he failed to bring the Paliy uprising to an end. On 19 August 1704, he succeeded, at last, in bringing about the alliance of Narva between Russia and the Polish republic to strengthen the hand of Augustus, but he failed to bring Prussia also into the anti-Swedish league because of Frederick I's fear of Charles and jealousy of Peter. From Berlin, Patkul went on to Dresden to conclude an agreement with the imperial commissioner Stratmann for renting a Russian auxiliary contingent in Saxon service to the Habsburgs.

== Arrest and execution ==
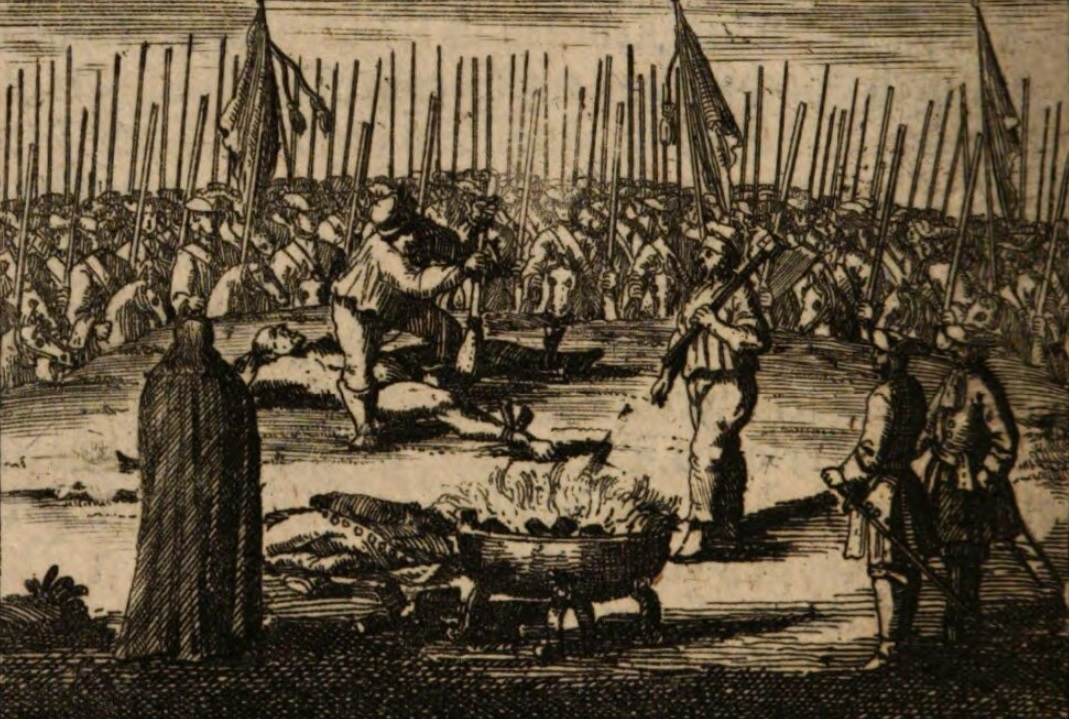
Execution of Johann Reinhold Patkul at Kazimierz Biskupi, Poland

The Saxon ministers, after protesting against the new arrangement, arrested Patkul and shut him up in the fortress of Sonnenstein on 19 December 1705, altogether disregarding the remonstrances of Peter against such a gross violation of international law. After the Treaty of Altranstädt on 24 September 1706, he was delivered up to Charles, who ordered his execution on the wheel. Charles rejected an appeal for mercy from his sister, the princess Ulrica, on the ground that Patkul, as a traitor, could not be pardoned for example's sake. In October 1707, Patkul was broken alive on the wheel at Kazimierz Biskupi (Casimir) in Poland.

The circumstances of Patkul's death were documented first by chaplain Loren(t)z Hagen, who accompanied Patkul in his last two days, in his 1707 book titled Das schmertzliche doch seelige Ende, Des Welt-Bekandten Joh. Reinhold Patkuls (English translation in 1761 under the title Anecdotes concerning the famous John Reinhold Patkul). Another account of Patkul's execution is a 1708 leaflet of unknown origin titled Kurtze Beschreibung der merck- und denckwürdigen Execution Des tapffern und Welt-bekanten General Patkuls, Wie selbiger den 10. October. 1707. zu Casimir in Pohlen erbärmlich hingerichtet worden [in English: Short description of the notable and memorable execution of the brave and world-famous general Patkul, how the same on 10 October 1707 in Casimir in Poland was executed miserably]. Differing slightly, the accounts agree that Patkul, after a prolonged process of breaking his bones with the wheel, begged for his decapitation (crying "Kopf ab!") and rolled to the block on his own; the following decapitation did however not succeed until after several strikes.

== Sources ==
- "Паткуль, Иоганн Рейнгольд" . Brockhaus and Efron Encyclopedic Dictionary (in Russian). 1906.
