= Treaty of Altranstädt (1706) =

1706 treaty between Sweden and Augustus the Strong

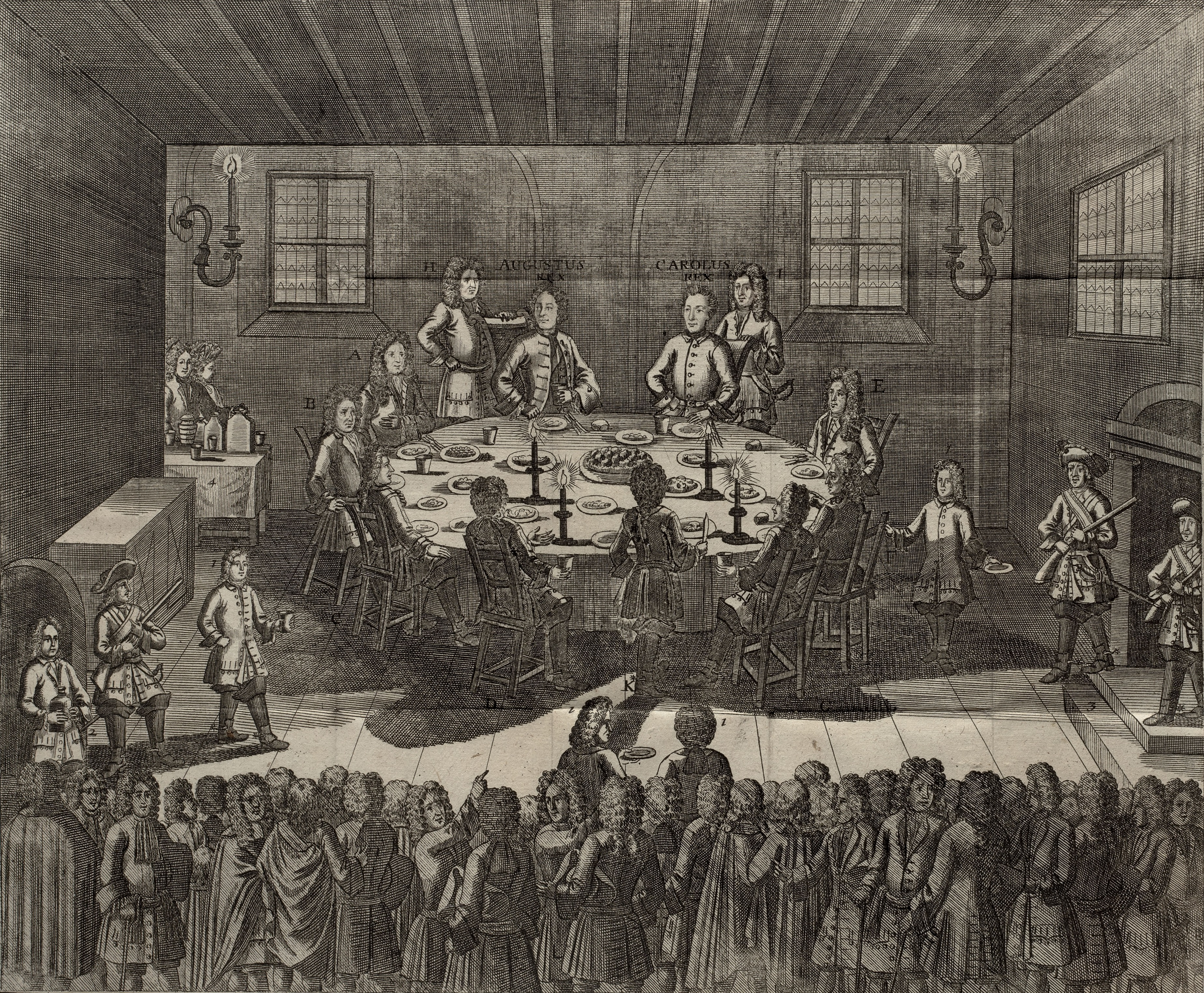
- Charles XII of Sweden in Altranstädt 1706-1707, by Johan David Swartz
- Type: Peace treaty
- Signed: 13 October 1706
- Location: Altranstädt
- Parties: Charles XII of Sweden; Augustus the Strong
- Language: Latin

The Treaty of Altranstädt was concluded between Charles XII of Sweden and Augustus the Strong of Saxony and Poland–Lithuania, on 13 October 1706, during the Great Northern War. Augustus had to renounce his claims to the Polish throne and his alliance with Russia.

== Background ==
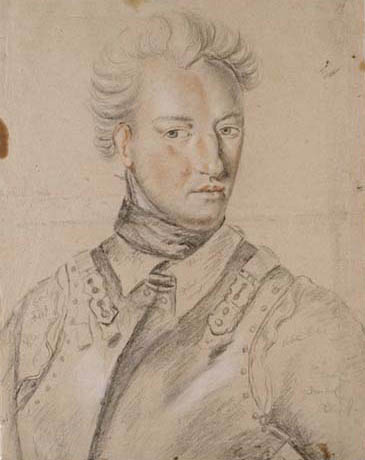
Charles XII of Sweden

On behalf of Charles XII, who had occupied much of the Polish–Lithuanian Commonwealth during the Great Northern War, Stanisław Leszczyński was crowned king of Poland on 4 October 1705. A faction of the commonwealth, organized in the Sandomierz Confederation, remained loyal to Saxon elector Augustus the Strong, Polish king since 1697 and allied against Charles XII with Russian tsar Peter the Great.

The resulting civil war in Poland (1704-1706) did not go well for August. His attempt to regain control in Poland–Lithuania was thwarted by Charles XII in the Battle of Grodno and by Carl Gustav Rehnskiöld in the Battle of Fraustadt, both in the first months of 1706. As a consequence of Fraustadt, the Saxon electorate was virtually undefended, and when Charles XII combined his forces with Rehskiöld and moved through Silesia to occupy it, he met no resistance.

== Terms ==
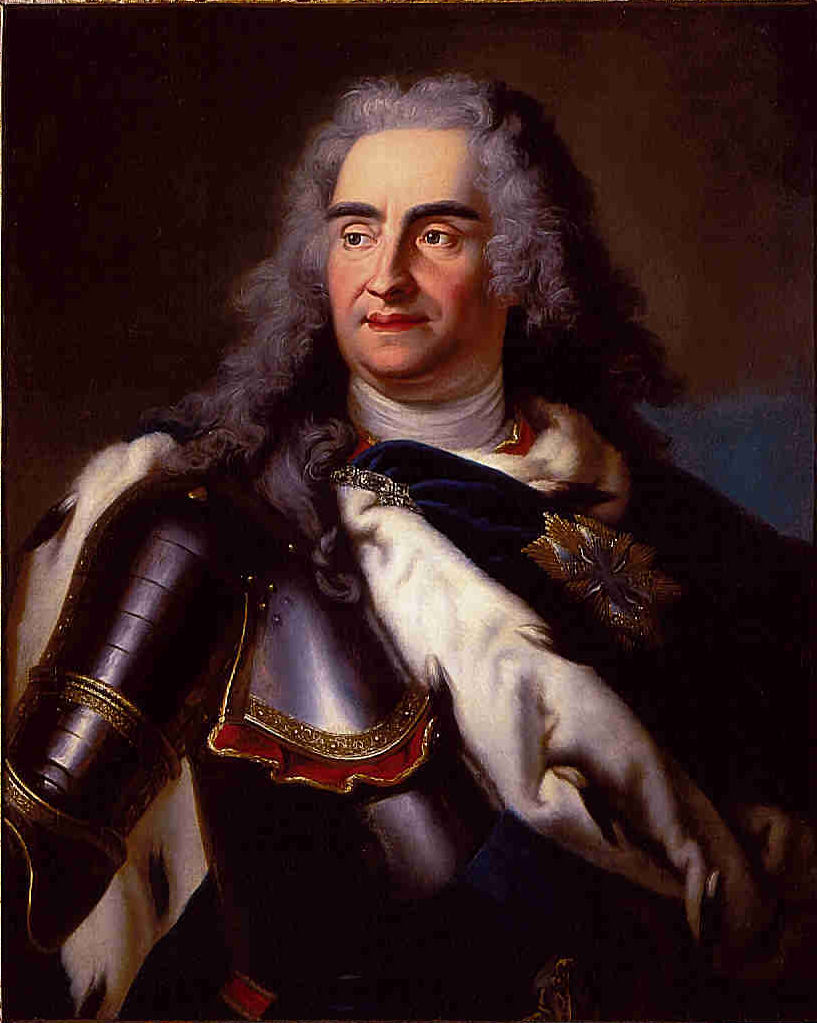
Augustus the Strong

Augustus the Strong made peace with the Swedish Empire. He renounced his claims to the Polish crown, accepted Stanisław Leszczyński as the Polish king and had to congratulate him.

Augustus' alliance with Russia, formalized in the Treaty of Preobrazhenskoye and the Treaty of Narva, was declared void. All Russians under Augustus' command were to be handed over to the Swedish as prisoners. Johann Patkul was declared a criminal and likewise taken in Swedish custody.

The treaty was concluded in secrecy.

== Consequences ==
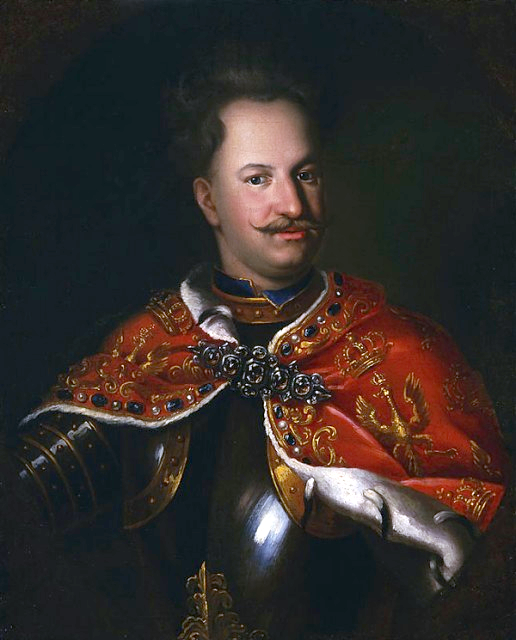
Stanisław Leszczyński

The diplomat and politician Johann Patkul was executed.

When the treaty was revealed to him, Peter the Great was disappointed. His diplomats, though aware of the possibility of a separate peace between Saxony and Sweden and actually negotiating a separate peace for Russia since 1703, had been unable to intervene. Furthermore, Peter had regarded Augustus not just as an ally, but as a close friend. With Augustus resigned, Peter unsuccessfully offered the yet to be conquered Polish crown to Hungarian rebel prince Francis II Rákóczi, to British general John Churchill, 1st Duke of Marlborough, to Polish Jakub Sobieski, to Savoyan commander in Habsburg service Eugene of Savoy, and to others.

In the Polish–Lithuanian Commonwealth, the treaty had improved Stanisław Leszczyński's position. He subsequently gained the loyalty of part of the lesser gentry.

By the Treaty of Thorn (1709), Augustus the Strong was restored as Polish king and renewed the alliance with Russia which was made possible by Peter the Great's victory over Charles XII in the Battle of Poltava 27 June 1709.

== Sources ==
=== Bibliography ===
- Anisimov, Evgeniĭ Viktorovich (1993). The reforms of Peter the Great. Progress through coercion in Russia. The New Russian history. M.E. Sharpe. ISBN 1-56324-047-5.
- Bromley, J. S. (1970). Rise of Great Britain & Russia, 1688-1725. The New Cambridge Modern History. Vol. 6. CUP Archive. ISBN 0-521-07524-6.
