= 1713 in Russia =

Events from the year 1713 in Russia

== Incumbents ==
- Monarch – Peter I

== Events ==
- Treaty of Schwedt was signed between Russia and Brandenburg-Prussia
- Battle of Pälkäne fought between Russia and Sweden
- Treaty of Adrianople (1713) was signed

== Birth ==
- Grigory Spiridov, Russian admiral
- Pyotr Sheremetev, Russian noble
- Mikhail Volkonsky, Russian statesman

== Death ==
- Feodor Lopukhin, Russian lawyer
- Ivan Andreyevich Tolstoy, Russian noble
- Feodosia Alekseyevna of Russia, Tsarevna of Russia
