= Treaty of Dresden (1699) =

1699 treaty of alliance between Saxony and Denmark-Norway

The Treaty of Dresden was concluded on 14 September 1699, preparing the Great Northern War. Augustus the Strong allied with Frederik IV of Denmark-Norway against Charles XII of Sweden.

== Sources ==
- Anisimov, Evgeniĭ Viktorovich (1993). The reforms of Peter the Great. Progress through coercion in Russia. The New Russian history. M. E. Sharpe. p. 53. ISBN 1-56324-047-5.
