= 1712 in Russia =

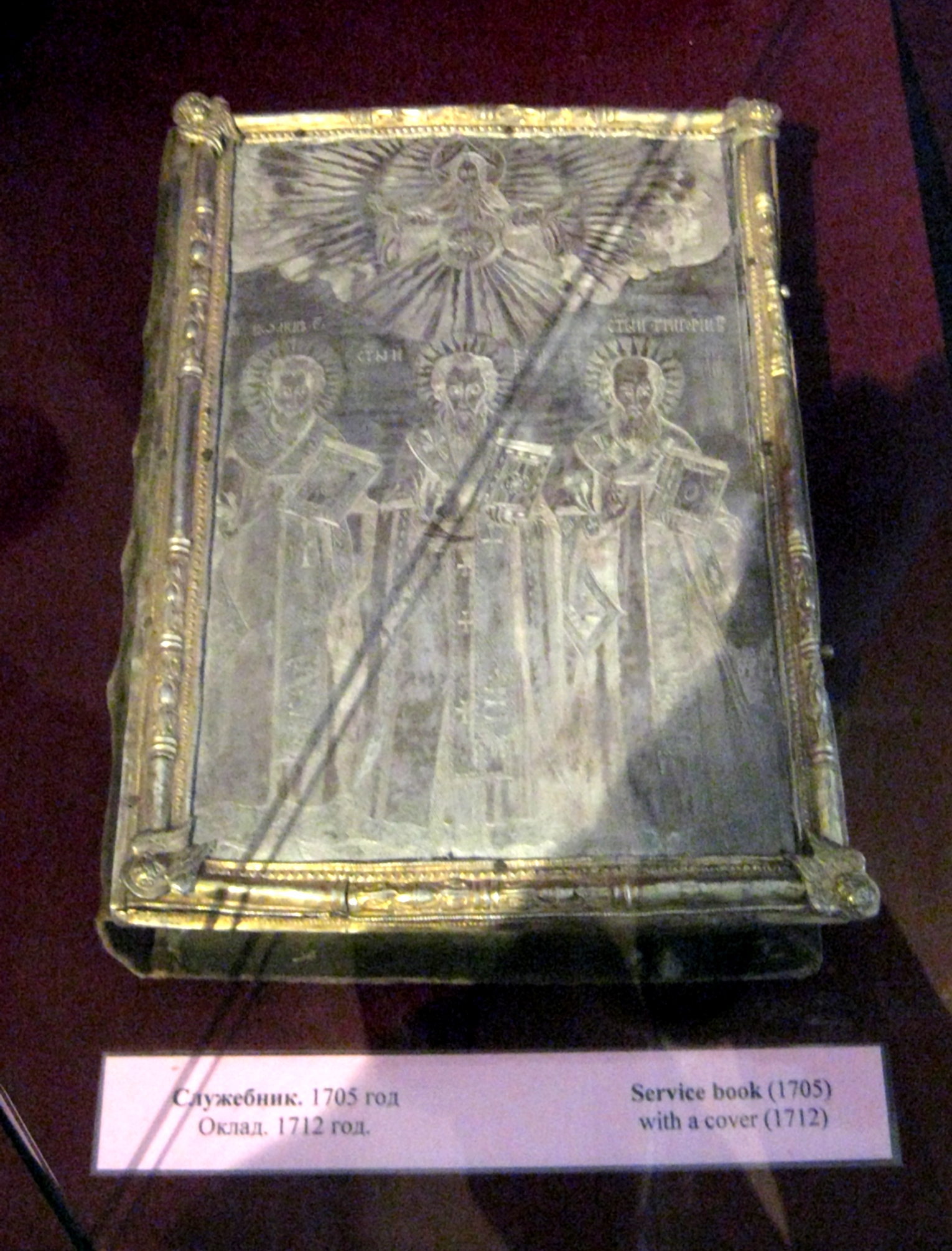
Sluzhebnik (Kirillo-Belozersk)

Events from the year 1712 in Russia

== Incumbents ==
- Monarch – Peter I

== Deaths ==
- Ekaterina Alekseyevna Dolgorukova
