= Treaty of Preobrazhenskoye =

1699 treaty

Treaty of Preobrazhenskoye in Russian and German (click for full PDF)

The Treaty of Preobrazhenskoye (or the Treaty of Preobrazhenskoe) was an alliance agreement between the Tsardom of Russia under Peter the Great and Poland–Saxony under King Augustus II the Strong.

It was negotiated by Johann Patkul and signed on 22 November 1699 in Preobrazhenskoye (now a part of Moscow), a favoured residence of the tsar. It followed an informal meeting of Peter and Augustus at Rava-Ruska in August 1698. The treaty called for the partition of the Swedish Empire among Denmark-Norway, Russia, Saxony and the Polish–Lithuanian Commonwealth. Following the treaty, the Great Northern War began.

== Sources ==
- Anisimov, Evgeniĭ Viktorovich (1993). The reforms of Peter the Great. Progress through coercion in Russia. The New Russian history. M.E. Sharpe. p. 53. ISBN 1-56324-047-5.
- Groß, Reiner (2007). Die Wettiner. Kohlhammer Urban Taschenbücher (in German). Vol. 621. Kohlhammer Verlag. pp. 181–182. ISBN 978-3-17-018946-1.
