= Pyotr Grigoryevich Demidov (1807–1862) =

Russian nobleman

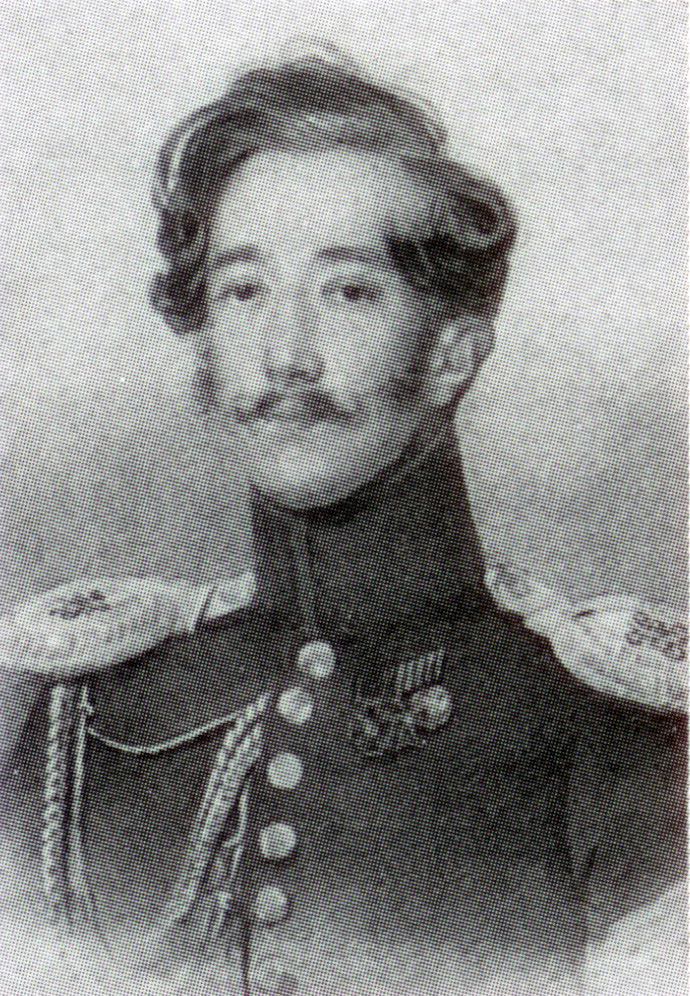
Demidov by Sokolov, 1835

Pyotr Grigoryevich Demidov (Russian: Пётр Григорьевич Демидов; 5 November 1807 – 14 April 1862) was a Russian nobleman and general. Most notably he was involved in the Hungarian campaign of 1849.

== Life ==
He was the second child of Grigory Alexandrovich Demidov and his wife Ekaterina Petrovna Lopuchina, daughter of Pyotr Lopukhin and sister of Anna Lopukhina. He joined the army in 1825 as a non-commissioned officer in a cavalry regiment. On 14 July that year he was promoted to cornet and for his part in suppressing the November Uprising to lieutenant. On 1 July 1833 he was made an adjutant and two years later a lieutenant-colonel. In 1842 he became a full colonel. On 3 April 1849 he became major general and on 8 September 1855 adjutant general – at the latter rank he accompanied Alexander II of Russia to Moscow for his coronation. He died of tuberculosis on 14 April 1862.

== Marriage and issue ==
On 12 July 1835 he married Elizaveta Hikolaevna Bezobrazova (1813–22 May 1876), by whom he had three children:

- Nikolai Petrovich (1836–1910);
- Ekaterina Petrovna (1838–?), married prince Nikolaj Sergeevič Kudašev;
- Grigory Petrovich (29 November 1840–1851/1852).

== Sources ==
- La Grande Enciclopedia russa, 2007 – V. 8 – pp. 496-768. ISBN 978-5-85270-338-5
