= Feodor Lopukhin =

Russian lawyer and nobleman (1638–1713)

Hilarion (Fedor) Abramovich Lopukhin (Russian - Илларион (Фёдор) Аврамович Лопухин; 1638 - 21 March 1713) was a Russian lawyer, nobleman, colonel, courtier and Boyar.

== Life ==
A member of the Lopukhin family of nobles, he was the third son of Abraham Nikitich Lopukhin (c.1685), a governor, nobleman and member of the Duma. His brothers were Peter the elder, Peter the younger, Kuzma, Vasily and Sergei.

He was a lawyer from at least 1658. In 1675 he protected the Kremlin wall and the following year he was sent to the Ferapontov Monastery with news of the death of Tsar Alexis and a request that the disgraced Patriarch Nikon of Moscow would posthumously forgive Alexis' persecution of Nikon in writing - Nikon refused. Next Hilarion became a colonel.

In 1681 he was sent to Verkhoturye in the provinces as a royal steward and on his return to Moscow he was granted the rank of courtier. In January 1689 Dowager Tsarina Natalya Naryshkina betrothed her 17-year-old-son Peter I to Hilarion's daughter Eudoxia, wishing to strengthen her position among the musketeers and the nobility - the Lopukhins were then in a dominant position in those circles. As the tsar's father-in-law, Hilarion became known as Feodor and was elevated to the rank of boyar. He became very close to the royal family and - thinking him dangerous - princess Sophia spread rumours about his family.

After several years of marriage, the relationship between Peter and Eudoxia deteriorated. In 1697 A P Sokovnin, Ivan Tsykler and F M Pushkin discovered a plot against Peter and its members cast suspicion on Eudoxia's relatives, although the latter's involvement was not proven. Before leaving for his European tour, Peter removed the Lopukhins from Moscow, with Feodor exiled to Totma, though how long he stayed there is unclear. He is still shown on the list of boyars living in the villages in 1705. In 1707 he founded an Athanasian nunnery in Meshchovsk. He was buried in a tomb at the Andronikov Monastery.

== Marriage and issue ==
He was married to Ustinia Bogdanovna Rtishchevo (died May 11, 1691, buried in the Andronikov Monastery), with whom he had a son and three daughters:

- Abram Fedorovich Lopukhin (d. 1718), close steward of Peter the Great, executed by order of the king
- Anastasia Feodorovna Lopukhina, wife of Prince Ivan Borisovich Troyekurov (1633-1703)
- Eudoxia Lopukhina (1670-1731), first wife of Peter the Great (1689-1698)
- Xenia Feodorovna Lopukhina (1678-1699), wife of Prince Boris Ivanovich Kurakin (1676-1727)
