= Kippen House =

- Дом купца Е. Ф. Киппена
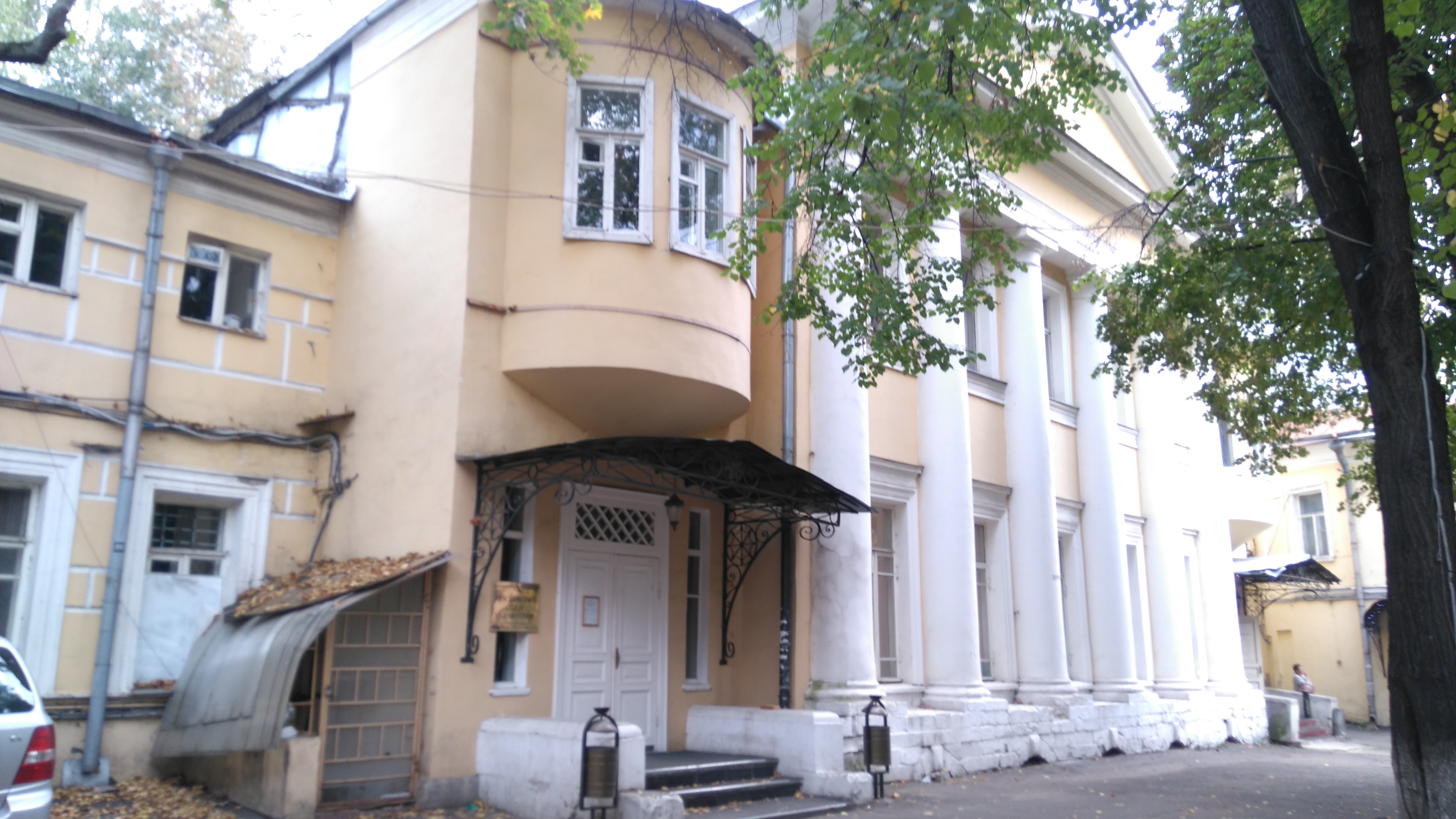
- Interactive map of Kippen House
- Location: Moscow, Starosadsky lane, house 5/8
- Beginning date: 1817
- Completion date: 1819

The house of the merchant E. F. Kippen (Russian: Дом купца Е. Ф. Киппена) is a city estate in the center of Moscow (Starosadsky lane, house 5/8). Built in 1817-1819 on the basis of an older building. Currently, the estate is occupied by the Moscow Union of Artists. The Kippen House has the status of an object of cultural heritage of federal significance.

== History ==
At the end of the 17th century the site was in the possession of the boyar Peter Lopukhin, the uncle of Queen Eudoxia Lopukhina. During the fire of 1812, the Lopukhins' estate was seriously damaged and five years later it was sold. Part of the possessions was acquired by the Lutheran community, and in 1818-1819 the church of St. Peter and Paul was built there. The other half of the plot was purchased by merchant E. F. Kippen and in 1817-1819 he built a manor house with a classical portico there. A fragment of the wall of the old Lopukhins' manor with a clypeus was found on the right side of the main house during the restoration works.

In 1844 the St. Petersburg crook K. Kh. Toll rebuilt the right wing of the manor, building the second floor. In 1857, the collegiate recorder A. I. Chernov built a left wing. At that time, behind the main house of the estate was a large garden (now there is a fire department number 47). At the end of the 19th century the estate was bought by the merchant F. N. Konkin.

== Architecture ==
The complex of the Kippen manor includes several buildings (Starosadskiy lane, house 5/8, building 2, 3, 4, 5, 6). The main house is in the backyard. On the central axis are the front gate. The central part of the facade of the manor house is marked with a large portico of six Doric half-columns, which unite two floors. The portico is completed by an almost smooth entablature and a large pediment. On the sides of the portico are two entrances, covered with wide forged umbrellas. On the second floor above the entrances are placed bay windows with ionic bases.
