= Tsesarevich Alexis =

Tsesarevich Alexis may refer to:

- Alexei Petrovich, Tsarevich of Russia (1690–1718), son and heir apparent of Peter the Great
- Alexei Nikolaevich, Tsarevich of Russia (1904–1918), son and heir apparent of Nicholas II of Russia
