= Anna Kramer =

Russian court official

Anna Ivanovna Kramer (1694-1770), was a Russian court official. She appears only in a small number of sources.

She was the daughter of a merchant in Narva, and was sent to Siberia as a prisoner of war after the Siege of Narva (1704) during the Great Northern War.

According to Schuyler, Kramer was introduced to the Imperial Russian court by Apraksin, and became favored by Peter the Great and Catherine I of Russia, who appointed her lady-in-waiting and chief of the household of Grand Duchess Natalya Alexeyevna of Russia (1714–1728). In 1716, she accompanied them on their European journey. The emperor gave her the task to arrange the burial of the murdered Tsarevich Alexei. She returned to Narva after the death of Tsarevna Natalia Alexeyevna. She may have been the same Anna Kramer who was granted the monopoly of selling timber from the forests around Narva, and became a successful merchant who exported 27 000 timbers annually.
