= Nikolai Petrovich Demidov-Lopukhin =

Russian nobleman and general

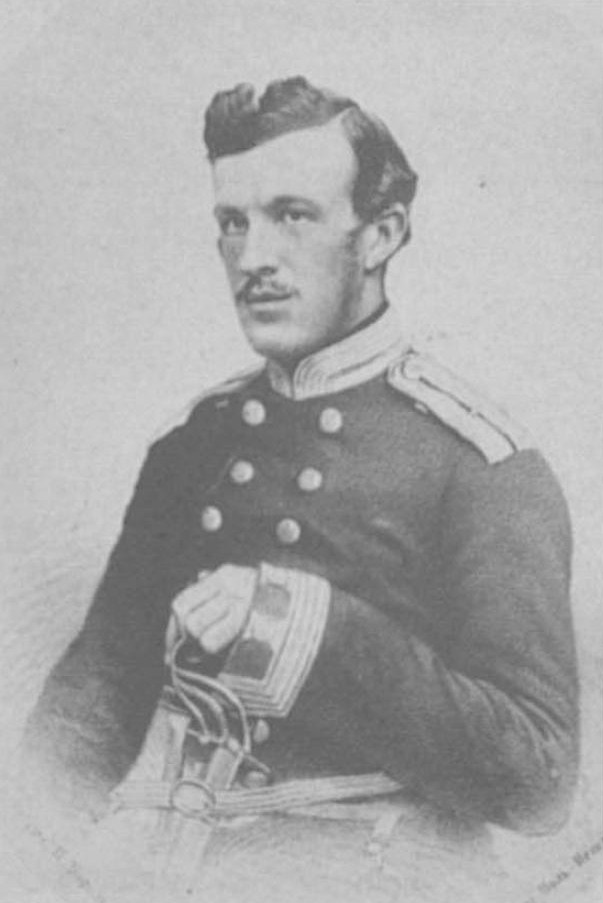
Nikolai in the 1870s.

Prince Nikolai Petrovich Demidov-Lopukhin (Russian: Никола́й Петро́вич Лопухи́н-Деми́дов; 27 April 1836, Saint Petersburg – 18 December 1910, Korsun-Shevchenkivskyi) was a Russian nobleman and general.

== Life ==
The eldest son of Pyotr Grigoryevich Demidov (1807–1862) and his wife Elizaveta Nikolaevna Bezobrazova, Nikolai was a godson of Nicholas I of Russia. He joined a guards cavalry regiment in 1853, and on 20 November 1854 was promoted to Sub-Lieutenant. From 1863 to 1864 he fought in the repression of the January Uprising. In 1870 he was promoted to colonel.

After the death of his relation, Prince Pavel Petrovich Lopukhin (son of Pyotr Lopukhin) in 1873, he inherited the princely title of the Lopukhin family and added its surname to his own. He fought in the Russo-Turkish War (1877–78), and, on 30 August 1880, was promoted to major general, followed by lieutenant general in May 1890.

== Marriage and issue ==
He married Olga Valerianovna Stolypina (1841–1926), the couple had four children that reached adulthood :

- Elizaveta (1864– Berlin 1941)
- Lev (1868–1909)
- Aleksandr (1870–1937)
- Vera (1871– died in the Revolution 1919)

Son general Alexandr Nikolajevitch Demidoff, 2nd Prince Lopukhin-Demidov, married in 1904 Natalia Dmitrievna Naryshkina (1886–1957), daughter of Dimitri Konstantinovich Naryshkin (1853-1918) and Countess Helene von Toll (1855-1931). They moved with their family to Finland after the Russian 1917 revolution. They owned Anttolanhovi manor near Mikkeli.

They had five sons that reached adulthood:

- Nikolai, 3rd Prince Lopukhin-Demidov (Tsarskoie Selo, 1904 – New Hampshire, United States 1995), had no issue.
- Sergei (Viipuri, Finland 1906 – Godoy Cruz, Argentina 1995)
- Georgi (St. Petersburg 1914 – Helsinki 1968); married in 1949 Tuovi Maria Wallenius (1918– ). No issue.
- Pjotr (St. Petersburg 1916 – 1998) had issue, surnamed Tammipuu.
- Aleksander (Tali, Wiborg Parish, Finland 1905 – Turku, Finland 1982). He married in 1953 Aili Dagmar Oksanen (1911–1991). They had one son: Yrjö Onni Johannes, 4th Prince Lopukhin-Demidov (Helsinki, Finland 23 Apr 1936 – Helsinki 31 Mar 2018); he married in 1974 Anita Maria Levlin (b. Vaasa Finland 1946).

They had two children:

- Nikolai Alexander Paul, 5th Prince Lopukhin-Demidov (b. Helsinki 1976)
- Natalia Anna Maria (b. Helsinki 1977)

== Sources ==
- La Grande Enciclopedia russa, 2007 - V. 8 - pp. 496–768. ISBN 978-5-85270-338-5
