= Natalya Alexeyevna =

Natalya Alexeyevna or Natalia Alexeievna may refer to:

- Tsarevna Natalya Alexeyevna of Russia (1673–1716), youngest daughter of Tsar Alexei; died unmarried at the age of 42.
- Grand Duchess Natalya Alexeyevna of Russia (1714–1728), elder sister of Emperor Peter II; died unmarried at the age of 14.
- Natalia Alexeievna (born Wilhelmina Louisa of Hesse-Darmstadt; 1755–1776), first wife of Emperor Paul; died after childbirth at the age of 20.
