= Ivan Lopukhin =

Russian philosopher (1756–1816)

- Иван Лопухин
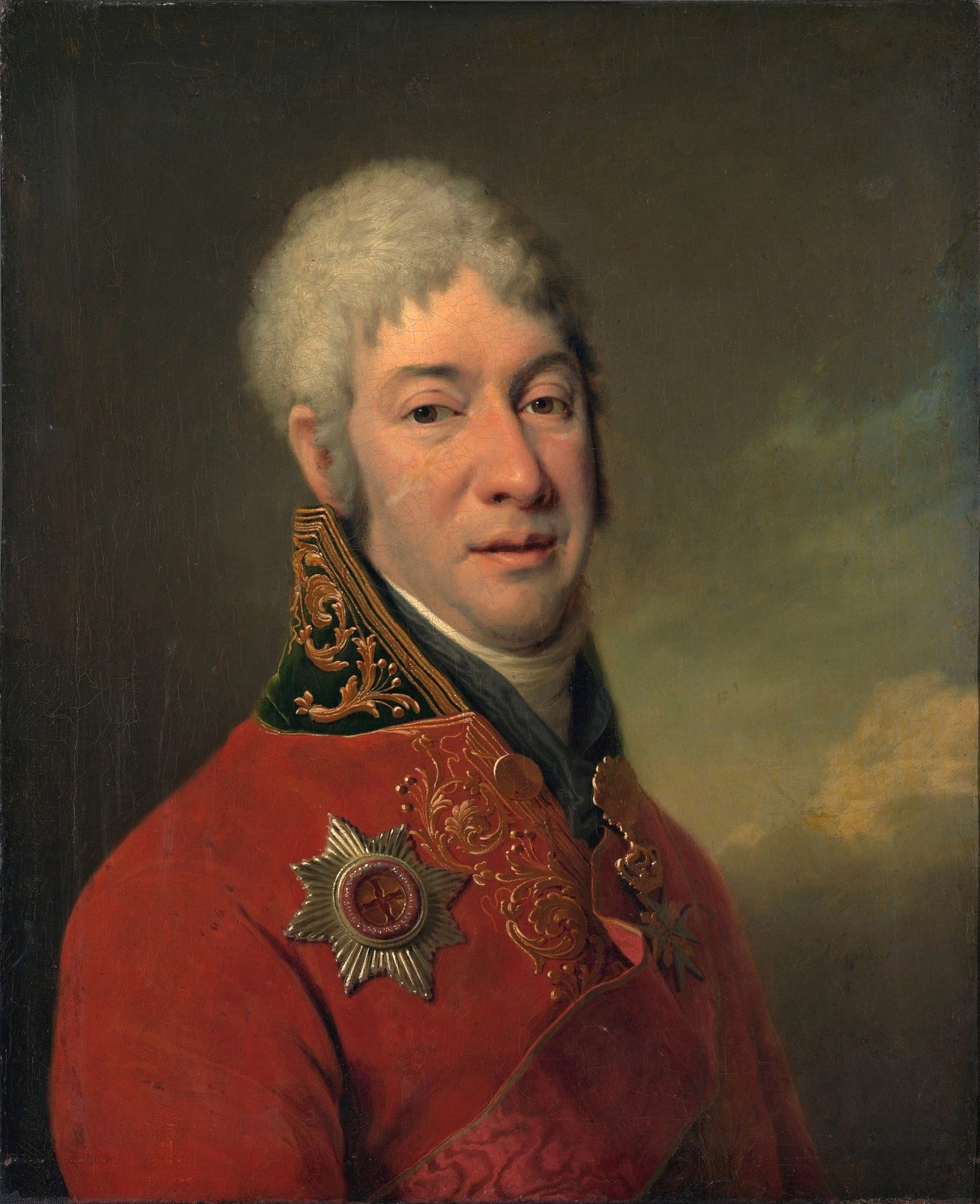
- Portrait by Dmitry Levitzky, 1802
- Born: 24 February 1756; Voskreskenskoye, Oryol Governorate, Russia
- Died: 22 June 1816 (aged 60); Voskreskenskoye, Oryol Governorate, Russia
- Occupations: Philosopher; mystic; writer; humanitarian

Ivan Vladimirovich Lopukhin (Russian: Ива́н Влади́мирович Лопухи́н; 6 March [O.S. 24 February] 1756 – 4 July [O.S. 22 June] 1816) was a Russian philosopher, mystic, writer and humanitarian.

== Biography ==
Ivan Lopukhin was born to the wealthy Lopukhin family in 1756 in Voskreskenskoye, Oryol Governorate, Russia.

Lopukhin joined the Preobrazhensky Lifeguard regiment in 1775. He retired a colonel 7 years later due to health concerns.

After serving as a counselor and later court president on the Moscow Criminal court between 1782 and 1785, he was introduced to rosicrucianism, martinism and freemasonry through his friend Nikolay Novikov and began a career as a writer and printer, while entering civil service. He became Senator in 1798.

In 1801, Tsar Alexander I asked Lopukhin to investigate complaints by the Dukhobortsy, his reports in 1802 leading to their resettlement on the Molochnaya River, along with other religious heretics (sektanty), mostly Molokane.

== Selective bibliography ==
- 1790 'Nravouchitelnyi Katezhizis Istinnykh Franmasonov'
- 1791 'Catechism of the True Freemason' Нравоучительный катехизис истинных франкмасонов
- 1791 'The Spiritual Knight or searching for wisdom". Духовный рыцарь или ищущий премудрости
- 1794 'The effusion of the heart of the man of Desire"
- 1795 'The description of several pictures and tableaus based on some fragments, which are located in the archives of Internal Affairs explaining the motives, actions and downright blindness of the corrupt Frenchmen'
- 1795 'Improvisations to songs by Davydov'
- 1796 'The image of the dream of equality, and the violent freedom being the fruits thereof'
- 1798 'Some Characteristics of the Interior Church'

== Sources ==
- Berg, A. 'Ivan Lopukhin and the Development of Mystical Historiosophy in Late Eighteenth-Century Russia' The Yearbook of the "Gheorghe Şincai" Institute for Social Sciences and the Humanities of the Romanian Academy XI, (2008): 44–57.
- Berg, Andreas (June 28, 2017) 'Mystical Enlightenment in Late Eighteenth-Century Russia', PhD thesis, School of Humanities, Languages and Social Science, Griffith University, Queensland, Australia. 372 pages. — Examines the thoughts of Grigory Savvich Skovoroda (1722-1796), Mikhail Matveyevich Kheraskov (1733-1807) and Ivan V. Lopukhin (1756-1816) as constitutive of a Mystical Enlightenment in Russia.
