= Grigory Alexandrovich Demidov =

Russian nobleman

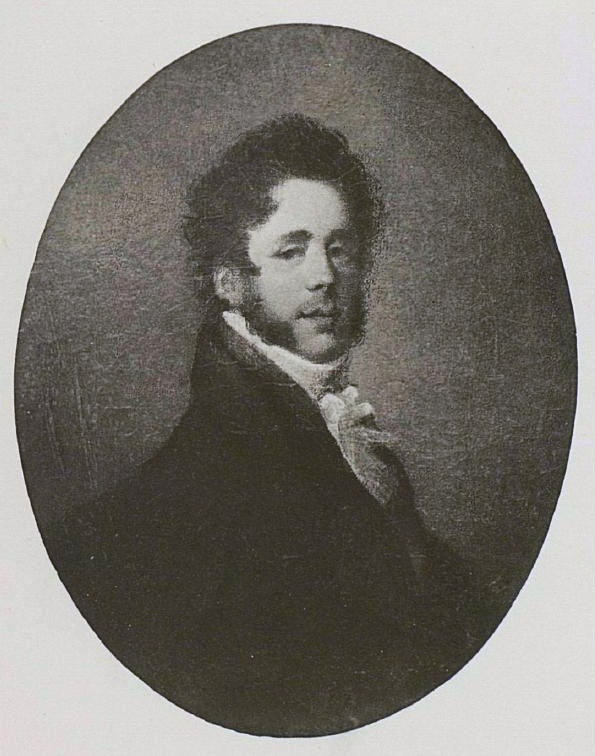
Demidov

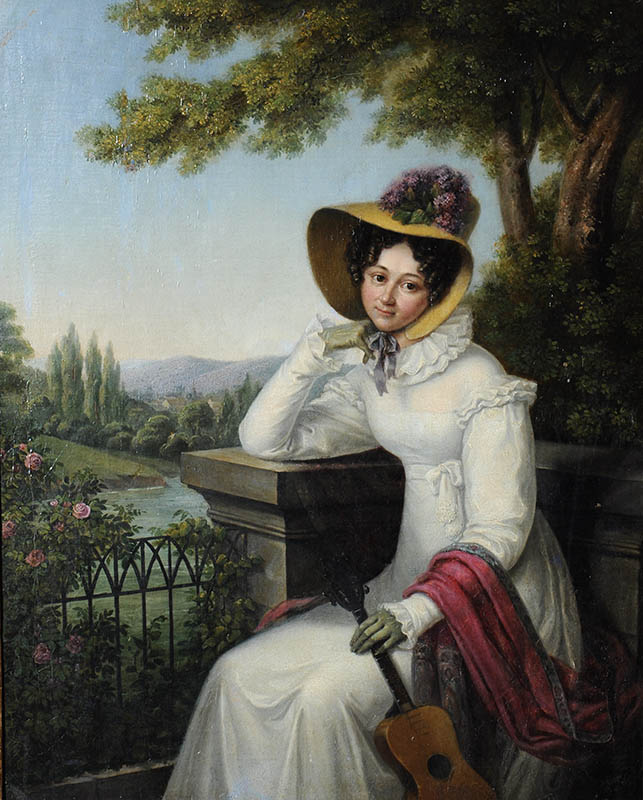
Demidov's wife Yekaterina Lopukhina.

Grigory Alexandrovich Demidov (Russian: Григорий Александрович Демидов; 21 February 1765 – 31 January 1827) was a Russian nobleman from the Demidov family.

== Life ==
He was a son of Aleksander Grigoryevich Demidov (1737-1803) and his wife Praskovya Matveyevna Olsufyeva (1780-1813), making him a nephew of Grigory Akinfievich Demidov. He initially served as an adjutant to Catherine II of Russia in a guards regiment. On 13 September 1797 he married princess Yekaterina Petrovna Lopukhina (11 April 1783-21 July 1830), daughter of Pyotr Lopukhin and his first wife, Praskovya Ivanovna Levshina. They had six children:

- Nikita Grigoryevich (26 June 1798-28 December 1813);
- Praskovya Grigoryevna (1799-1840), married Aleksandr Aleksandrovich Bakhteyev;
- Aleksandr Grigoryevich (1803-1853);
- Pyotr Grigoryevich (1807-1862);
- Pavel Grigoryevich (1809-1858);
- Anna Grigoryevna (1810-1840), married Aleksandr Yegorovich Engelhardt.

After his father's death in 1803 Grigory inherited a huge fortune. He was noted for his charity work and in 1817 he donated 410 books to the Moscow University, including several rare works. He is buried in the Lazarevskoe Cemetery at the Alexander Nevsky Lavra.
