= Charlotte Christine of Brunswick-Wolfenbüttel =

Tsarevna of Russia

- Tsarevna of Russia
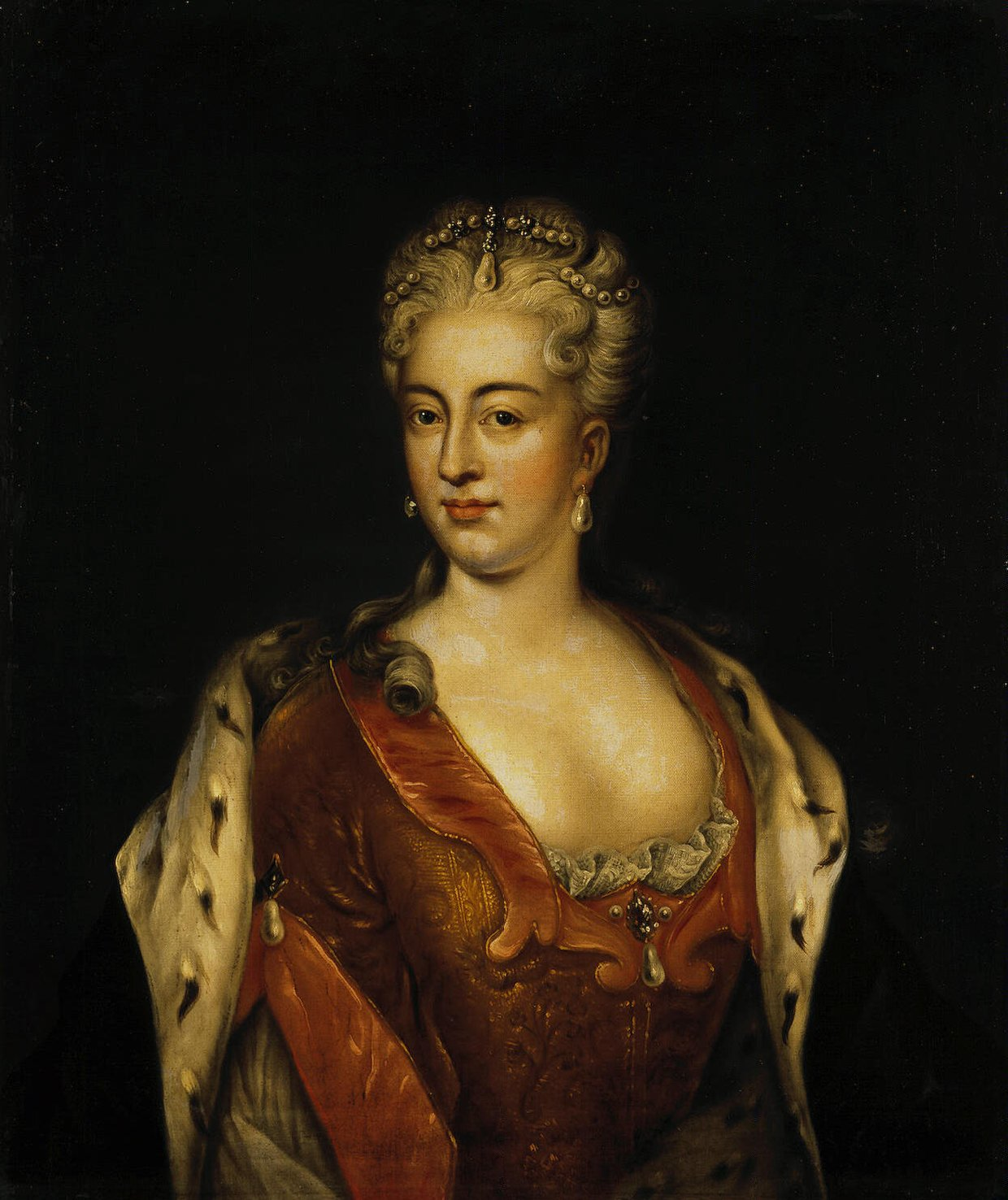
- Anonymous portrait of Charlotte Christine
- Born: 28 August 1694; Wolfenbüttel, Germany
- Died: 2 November 1715 (aged 21); Saint Petersburg, Russia
- Burial: Peter and Paul Cathedral
- Spouse: Alexei Petrovich, Tsarevich of Russia (m. 1711)
- Issue: Grand Duchess Natalya Alexeyevna; Peter II of Russia
- House: Welf
- Father: Louis Rudolph, Duke of Brunswick-Wolfenbüttel
- Mother: Princess Christine Louise of Oettingen-Oettingen

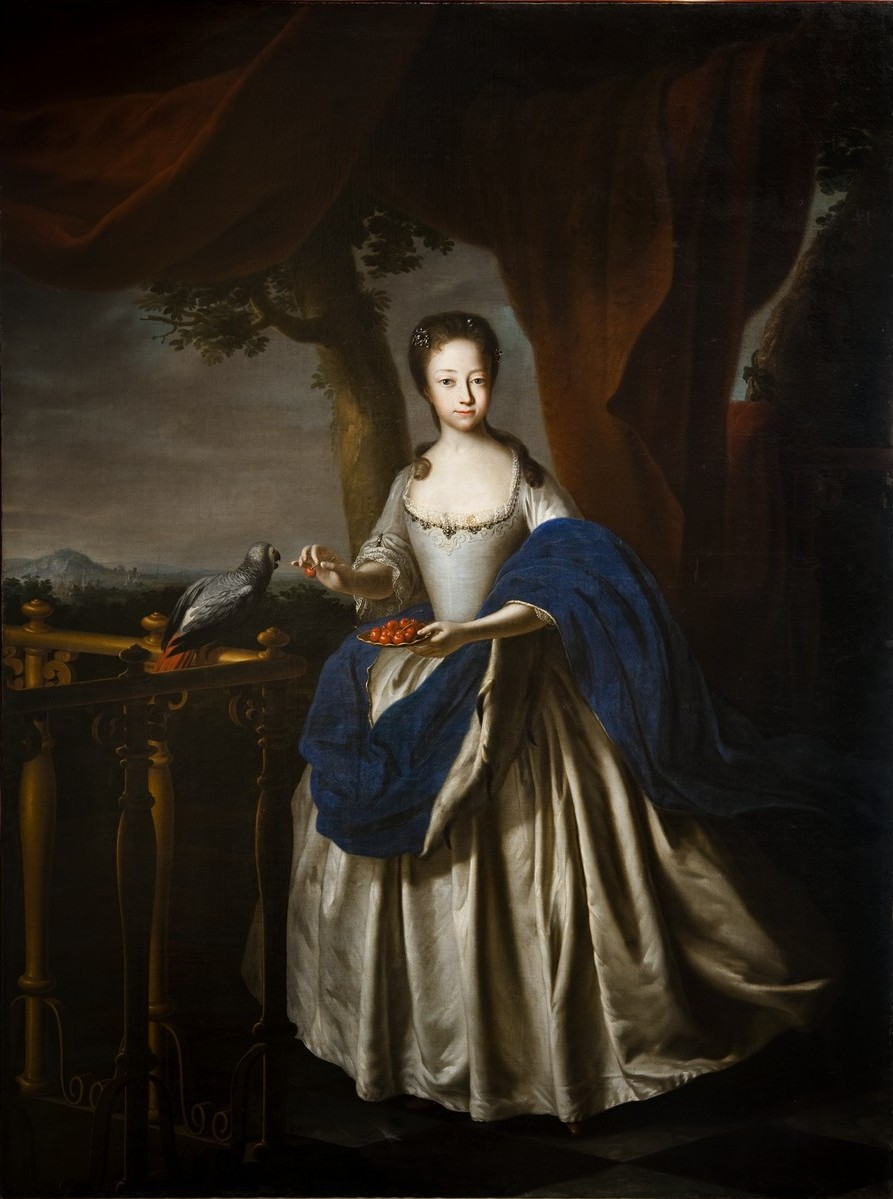
Ceremonial portrait of Charlotte Christine, by an unidentified painter. The portrait appears to have been painted between 1710 and 1715.

Charlotte Christine Sophie also known as Sophie Charlotte, or simply Charlotte (Шарлотта Кристина Брауншвейг-Вольфенбюттельская; 28 August 1694, in Wolfenbüttel – 2 November 1715, in Saint Petersburg), was the wife of Tsarevich Alexei Petrovich of Russia. She was the daughter of Louis Rudolph, Duke of Brunswick-Wolfenbüttel and Princess Christine Louise of Oettingen-Oettingen.

== Early life and education ==
Charlotte Christine was brought up at the court of the Polish King August II, whose consort Christiane Eberhardine of Brandenburg-Bayreuth was her godmother and her relative. She received a good education for that time period. In late 1709, Tsar Peter I of Russia sent his son Alexei to Dresden to finish his education. There, he met Charlotte for the first time.

== Marriage ==
She seemed a good match to Tsar Peter for his son because her elder sister Elizabeth Christine was married to the Holy Roman Emperor Charles VI, and the support of Austria in the upcoming fight with the Turks was appreciated by Russian diplomats.

On 25 October 1711 at Torgau, Charlotte Christine married Tsarevich Alexei, eldest son and heir of Peter I of Russia by his first wife, Eudoxia Lopukhina. She was allowed to keep her Lutheran faith, but any children would be raised as Russian Orthodox. This marriage was the second to break the old tradition of the Russian imperial family only marrying members of the Russian nobility, the first being Anna Ivanovna's marriage to Frederick William, Duke of Courland the year before. She was the first female member of a foreign European dynasty to marry a man of the Russian imperial family since Zoe Palaiologina, around 200 years earlier. In 1713 she arrived in Russia.

Charlotte enjoyed the favour of Tsar Peter the Great, but lived an isolated life with her own court, which was composed almost entirely by foreigners and headed by her first cousin, Princess Juliana Luise von Ostfriesland. In the beginning her marriage to Alexei was happy, but his drunkenness soon began to strain their relationship. Peter the Great also often took his son on war campaigns with him, thus even further isolating Charlotte. In the early weeks of their marriage, Peter ordered her to return to Petersburg without him or his son, but she had run back to her father's palace. Peter was the one who retrieved her, but soothed her instead of showing anger, and told her that she was free to visit her family whenever, but would have to tell him in the future. The Tsarevich also had an open affair with Yefrosinya Fedorova which started during Charlotte's short lifetime and continued after her death.

=== Children and death ===
Charlotte found some consolation in the birth of a daughter, Natalia, and a son, later Peter II of Russia. She died ten days after the birth of her son. Both her daughter Natalia and son Peter died aged 14 without issue.

== Legend ==
Some fifty years after her death, a legend developed, according to which Charlotte did not die in 1715 and, instead of her corpse, a wooden doll was put in her coffin. According to this, she fled to Louisiana, where she married a French officer named d'Auban or d'Aubant, with whom she had a daughter and moved to Paris, France. Later they moved to the island of Bourbon, and when d'Auban died, Charlotte returned to Europe, living in Paris and Brussels, Belgium, with a pension from her niece, Empress Maria Theresa of Austria.

== In popular culture ==
Heinrich Zschokke developed the legend of Charlotte into a novella, titled "Die Prinzessin von Wolfenbüttel". Charlotte Birch-Pfeiffer wrote a libretto about it.

=== Santa Chiara opera ===
Duke Ernest of Saxe-Coburg wrote the opera "Santa Chiara" about the wife of the Tsarevich. In the version of this opera, which takes places in the magnificent palace of the tsarevich in Moscow, Charlotte Christine, who suffers because of her abusive husband, desperately wants to return to Germany. She sent her secretary, Herbert, to Germany to ask for permission to return, but it was rejected. It is revealed that she is secretly in love with Victor de St Auban. With the intention of getting rid of his wife, the tsarevich Alexis tries to kill Charlotte Christine with a glass of poisoned wine. After drinking it, Charlotte Christine falls lifeless.

However, she is not dead but only asleep because instead of poison what she drank was just a narcotic (which the physician Aurelius gave to the tsarevich Alexis, making him believe that it was poison). During the funeral and just before the coffin was closed, Aurelius and Herbert abduct Charlotte Christine without being noticed.

Ten months later, Charlotte Christine is happily living unrecognized in the port of Resina, near Naples, southern Italy, where she is called Chiara and worshipped by the local population as a saint ("Santa Chiara"). The tsarevich Alexis also arrives in Resina, fleeing from Russia after a failed conspiracy against his father. On the orders of the Tsar, Victor de St Auban and Aurelius followed him. After meeting his prosecutors and Charlotte Christine, whom he thinks is a ghost, the tsarevich Alexis commits suicide.

== Ancestry ==
Ancestors of Charlotte Christine of Brunswick-Wolfenbüttel

8. Augustus II, Duke of Brunswick-Wolfenbüttel
4. Anthony Ulrich, Duke of Brunswick-Wolfenbüttel
9. Princess Dorothea of Anhalt-Zerbst
2. Louis Rudolph, Duke of Brunswick-Wolfenbüttel
10. Frederick, Duke of Schleswig-Holstein-Sonderburg-Norburg
5. Princess Elisabeth Juliana of Schleswig-Holstein-Sonderburg-Norburg
11. Princess Eleanor of Anhalt-Zerbst
1. Duchess Charlotte Christine of Brunswick-Wolfenbüttel
12. Joachim Ernest, Count of Oettingen-Oettingen
6. Albert Ernest I, Prince of Oettingen-Oettingen
13. Countess Anna Dorothea of Hohenlohe-Neuenstein
3. Princess Christine Louise of Oettingen-Oettingen
14. Eberhard III, Duke of Württemberg
7. Duchess Christine Friederike of Württemberg
15. Wild- and Rhinegravine Anna Katharina of Salm-Kyrburg

== Sources ==
- "Шарлотта, супруга царевича Алексея Петровича" . Brockhaus and Efron Encyclopedic Dictionary (in Russian). 1906.
- Montefiore, Simon Sebag (2016). The Romanovs: 1613—1918. Knopf Doubleday Publishing Group.
