= Anna Lopukhina =

Russian imperial mistress (1777–1805)

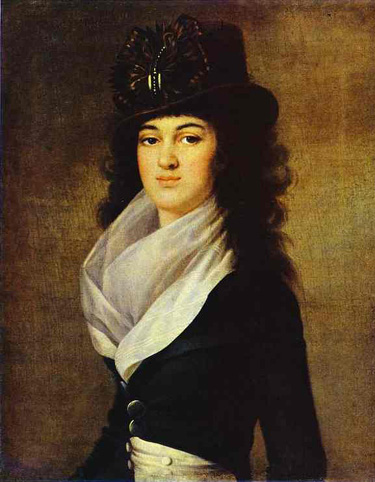
- Portrait by Jean-Louis Voille, c. 1792–1793
- Born: 8 October 1777
- Died: 25 April 1805 (aged 27)

Princess Anna Petrovna Lopukhina (Russian: Анна Петровна Лопухина; 8 November 1777 – 25 April 1805) was a royal mistress to Emperor Paul of Russia. In 1798, she replaced Catherine Nelidova as the chief mistress.

== Family ==
She was the daughter of Prince Pyotr Vasilyevich Lopukhin, from the Lopukhin family, one of the oldest families of Russian nobility, which owed its distinction to Eudoxia Lopukhina's marriage to Peter the Great and of which the unfortunate Natalia Lopukhina was also a member. Her mother was Praskovia Ivanovna Levshina.

== Royal mistress ==
Lopukhina met Emperor Paul during a ball in 1796. His tenderness towards her was noted by a court faction which hoped to use her as a remedy against the influence of the Empress Maria Feodorovna. The Emperor was told that the girl, hopelessly in love with him, was on the verge of killing herself on that account. When Paul ordered her family to be brought to Saint Petersburg, the Empress ineffectually attempted to interfere and sent an angry letter to Lopukhina pressing her to stay at home. The letter was intercepted and presented to the emperor in the most unfavourable light, thus sparking a quarrel between the spouses and ensuring Lopukhina's ascendance at court.

After Anna was brought to the capital, the Emperor appointed her father General Procurator and made him Prince with the title of His Serene Highness. Anna herself was showered with awards, including the Order of Saint John. On Paul's urging, the translation of her Hebrew name – "grace" – was given to warships and inscribed on the standards of the imperial guards. All things considered, Lopukhina's influence on the tsar's irascible character is reckoned to have been beneficial, although the Emperor's constant attention seemed to importune her so much that in 1799 she asked his permission to marry a childhood friend, Prince Pavel Gagarin. After the sovereign acquiesced, Gagarin was recalled from Alexander Suvorov's army then fighting in Italy and the wedding took place on 11 January 1800. The marriage was also to protect her from public spite.

== Later life and death ==
A year later, the Emperor was murdered and the Gagarins proceeded to Turin, where her husband Prince Gagarin was appointed ambassador. Theirs was a marriage of convenience, and he seems to have had little reason for grief when she died of consumption in 1805 at the age of 27. Anna's body was brought back to the Russian capital, where her tomb may be seen in the St Lazarus Church of the Alexander Nevsky Lavra.
