= Eudoxia Lopukhina =

Tsaritsa of Russia from 1689 to 1698

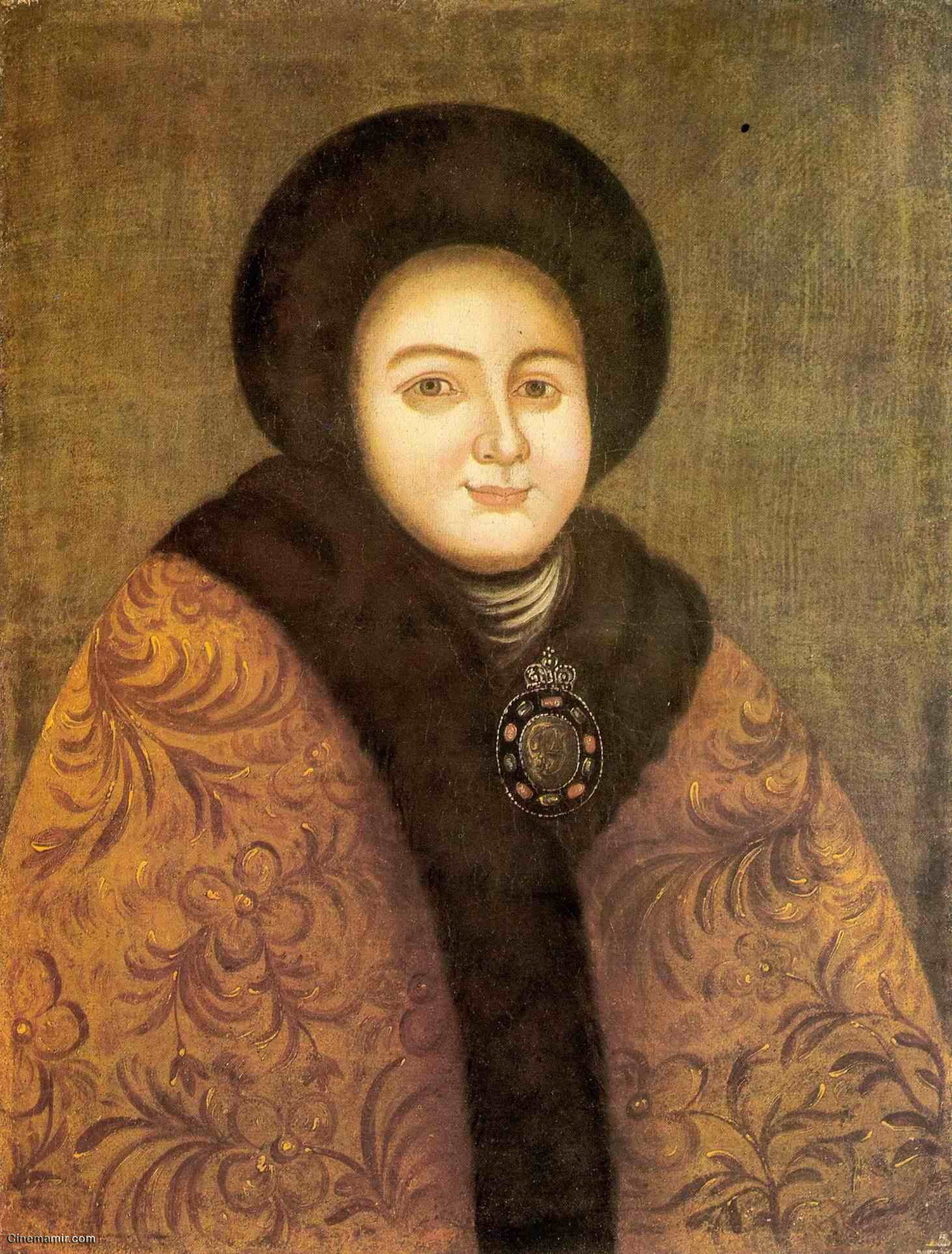

Tsaritsa consort of Russia
- Tenure: 1689–1698
- Coronation: 1689
- Predecessor: Praskovia Saltykova
- Successor: Catherine I Alexeyevna
- Co-Tsaritsa: Praskovia Saltykova (1684 - 1696)
- Born: 9 August [O.S. 30 July] 1669; Moscow, Russia
- Died: 7 September [O.S. 27 August] 1731 (aged 62); Moscow, Russia
- Burial: Novodevichy Convent
- Spouse: Peter I of Russia (m. 1689; ann. 1698)
- Issue: Alexei Petrovich, Tsarevich of Russia; Grand Duke Alexander Petrovich; Grand Duke Peter Petrovich
Names
- Evdokiya Feodorovna Lopukhina
- House: Lopukhin
- Father: Feodor Abramovich Lopukhin
- Mother: Ustinia Bogdanovna Rtishcheva

Eudoxia Fyodorovna Lopukhina (Russian: Евдокия Фёдоровна Лопухина; 9 August 1669 – 7 September 1731) (Note: Old Style date: 30 July 1669 – 27 August 1731) was the tsaritsa of all Russia from 1689 to 1698 as the first wife of Peter I. She was the last ethnic Russian and non-foreign wife of a Russian monarch. She was the mother of Tsarevich Alexei Petrovich and the paternal grandmother of Peter II of Russia.

== Early life ==
Eudoxia was born to Feodor Abramovich Lopukhin and Ustinia Bogdanovna Rtishcheva, making her a member of the Lopukhin family and a noble.

== Tsaritsa ==
She was chosen as a bride for the Tsar by his mother Natalia Naryshkina primarily on account of Eudoxia's mother's relation to the famous boyar Fyodor Rtishchev. She was crowned Tsarina in 1689 and gave birth to Grand Duke Alexei Petrovich of Russia the following year. She had two more sons by Peter, Alexander in 1691 and Paul in 1693, but both died during infancy. The Tsar could not stand her conservative relatives and soon abandoned her for a Dutch beauty, Anna Mons. Eudoxia's letters to Peter were full of complaints and expressions of unrequited love.

In 1696, during his prolonged journey to Western Europe, Peter asked his Naryshkin relatives to persuade Eudoxia to enter a monastery. This could not be effected until 1698, when she was finally banished to the Intercession Convent of Suzdal.

== Later years ==
The local hegumen, however, allowed her to live there much as a lay woman would. She even found herself a lover, an officer named Stepan Glebov. Nine years later, when Peter the Great learned about their affair, he sentenced Glebov to execution by impalement. According to the legend, the Emperor also ordered the soldiers to force Eudoxia to watch her lover's death.

Gradually, Eudoxia and her son became the centre of opposition to Peter's reforms, primarily from the church officials. In his sermons, Demetrius of Rostov referred to Eudoxia as "our great sovereign" and prophesied her impending return to the throne. This conservative party was shattered by Peter in 1718. During the prosecution of Tsarevich Alexei Petrovich of Russia, all the bishops who supported her were executed, and Eudoxia was transferred to a convent in Ladoga.

After Peter's death and the rise of his second Empress consort Catherine I on the throne, Eudoxia was secretly moved to Shlisselburg Fortress near St. Petersburg, where she was under strict custody as a state prisoner in a dungeon.

In 1727, her grandson Peter II ascended the Russian throne and immediately recalled her to Moscow. She returned to the former capital with a great pomp and was allowed to keep her own court at the Novodevichy Convent until her death in 1731.

After the death of Peter II, who had died before her in 1730, she was among the nominated candidates for the new monarch, but she declined, in favor of her niece-in-law Empress Anna, so Anna continued to honor her.

== Issue ==
By Peter I, she had three sons:

- Tsarevich Alexei of Russia (18 February 1690 – 26 June 1718). After his mother's fall in disgrace he lived a particularly precarious life, and was eventually imprisoned by his father on charges of conspiring against him. He died in prison as a result of the lashes inflicted him, just two days after being officially sentenced to death by his father and the Senate. In 1711 he had married the Princess Charlotte Christine of Brunswick-Wolfenbüttel, sister of the wife of Charles VI of Habsburg. He had two children by her: Natalya (1714–1728) and the future tsar Peter II (1715–1730).
- Grand Duke Alexander (Preobrazhnskoe, 3 October 1691 – Moscow, 14 May 1692). He was baptized on 11 November 1691 in the Chudov Monastery, with his paternal aunt Grand Duchess Natalya Alekseevna Romanova as godmother. He died at the age of one and a half and was buried on 24 May 1692 in the Cathedral of the Archangel Michael inside the Moscow Kremlin. The father, in defiance of his wife from whom he was now completely estranged, did not take part in the funeral.
- Grand Duke Paul (1693–1693)

== Notes ==
Russian royalty
Vacant Title last held by Praskovia Saltykova	Tsaritsa consort of Russia; 1689–1698	Vacant Title next held by Marta Skavronskaya
