= Lopukhin family =

Russian noble family

The House of Lopukhin was an old Russian noble family, most influential during the Russian Empire, forming one of the branches of the Sorokoumov-Glebov family.

== History ==
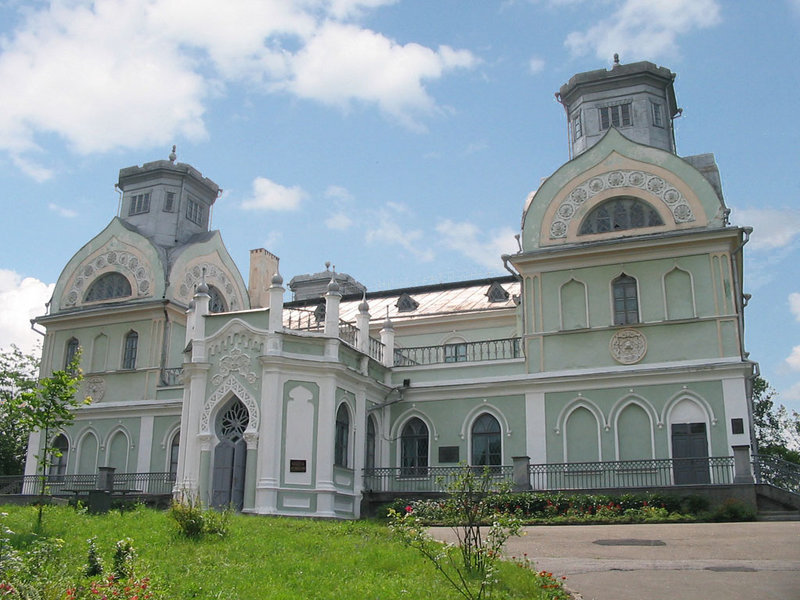
Lopukhin palace

The family is said to have descended from Rededya and first appeared in the 14th century documents as Boyars of Ivan I of Moscow. The Laptev family shares the same roots as the Lopukhin family, as they descended from two brothers, Esip - nicknamed Lapot, who became the founder of the Laptevs, and Vasily - nicknamed Lopukha, founder of the Lopukhins. The family's prominence started when Eudoxia Lopukhina married Peter the Great. When Pyotr Lopukhin's son died childless, the family's princely title passed to Nikolai Petrovich Demidov-Lopukhin. The present Prince Lopukhin-Demidov is Nikolai Alexander Paul Demidoff, born in 1976.

== Notable members ==
- Anna Lopukhina (1777–1805), a (perhaps platonic) mistress of Emperor Paul of Russia
- Barbara Bakhmeteva (née Lopukhina; 1815–1851), Russian noblewoman, a muse of Mikhail Lermontov
- Eudoxia Lopukhina (1669–1731), the first wife of Peter I of Russia
- Ivan Lopukhin (1756–1816), Russian philosopher, mystic, writer and humanitarian
- Natalia Lopukhina (1699–1781), a daughter of Matryona Balk, who was sister of Anna Mons and Willem Mons
- Pyotr Lopukhin (1753–1827), Russian politician

== Bibliography ==
- Краевский Б. П. Лопухины в истории Отечества (к 1000- летию рода»- М.: ЗАО Изд-во Центрполиграф, 2001. — 861 с. илл. Серия «Россия забытая и неизвестная. Русские фамилии».
- Аграрная история Северо-запада России XVI в. Новгородские пятины. Л., 1974.
- Акты Московского государства. Т. I. — СПб., 1890; Т. II. — СПб., 1894; Т. III. — СПб., 1901.
- Алфавитный список захоронений на кладбище в Сен — Женевьев де Буа. Париж.
- Альманах «Дворянское Собрание». — М., 1996, № 4.
- Алявдин В. И. Об общности происхождения семи родов Ушаковых и их гербах // Летопись Историко-Родословного Общества в Москве. Вып. 2 (46) 1994. С 86-44.
- Андроников И. Л. М. Ю. Лермонтов. Исследования и находки. М., 1967, с. 184,216,218.
- Антонов А. В. Родословные росписи конца XVII в. М., 1996.
- Антонова Н. Авдотьино. М.: Московский рабочий, 1991.
- Аргунов А. А. Азеф — социалист-революционер // Провокатор: Воспоминания и документы о разоблачении Азефа. [Л.], 1929, с. 13-133.
- Аринштейн Л. М. «Ребенка милого рожденье» // Лермонтовская энциклопедия. М., 1999, с. 463—464.
- Архив Департамента Герольдии Российского Дворянского Собрания.
- Аурова Н. Н. «Из окна старого дома...». Введенское, Московской обл. // Мир русской усадьбы. — М.: Наука, 1995. С. 214—225.
- Ацаркина Э. Карл Павлович Брюллов. Жизнь и творчество. М.: Искусство, 1963.
- Балуев Б. П. Дело А. А. Лопухина // ВИ, 1996, № 1, с. 134—143.
- Бантыш-Каменский Д. К. Словарь достопамятных людей русской земли. СПб., 1863.
- Баранова-Писарева Е. П. Дневник путешествия. Рукопись. 1920. Собственность наследников.
- Бердяев Н. А. Судьба России. — М. 1990.
- Бернадский В. Н. Новгород и новгородская земля в XV в. — М. — Л., 1950.
- Бернштейн-Коган Я. М. Кишиневский погром 1903 г. //СИОН, 1975, № 11, с. 131—149.
- Бобринский А. А., гр. Дворянские роды, внесенные в Общий гербовник Всероссийской Империи. Ч.1. Спб. 1890.
- Богатых М. Смиренное кладбище // газета Россия 1991.- № 50.
- Богданович А. В. Три последних самодержца. — М.: Новости, 1990.
- Болотов А. Т. Записки. СПб., 1871.
- Большой Кремлёвский дворец. Указатель к обозрению / Мин. Императорского Двора. — СПб, 1916.
- Бочков В. Н. «Старая Кострома». Кострома: Эврика М, 1997.
- Боярские списки посл. четв. XVI — н. XVII вв. и роспись русского войска 1604 года. Указатель состава Государева Двора по фонду Разрядного приказа. — М., 1979.
- Бродский Б., Калугин В. ... А теперь музей. М.: Советский художник, 1969.
- Будылина М. В., Братцева О. И., Харламова А. М. Архитектор Н. А. Львов. М., 1961. С.104.
- Булычев Н. И. Калужская губерния. Списки дворян, внесенных в Дворянскую Родословную Книгу по 1 сентября 1908 г. — Калуга, 1908.
- Булычев Н. И. Тульская губерния. Списки дворян, внесенных в Дворянскую Родословную книгу. Тула, 1908.
- Бурсин К. М., Попов Г. П. Старейшее мореходное. — Архангельск, 1976.
- Бурцев В. Л. В погоне за провокаторами. М.-Л., 1928. 228 с.
- Бычкова M.Е. Состав класса феодалов России XVI в. — М.:Наука, 1986.
- Бычкова М. Е. Родословные книги XVI—XVII вв. — М.: Наука, 1975.
- В окрестностях Москвы. Из истории русской усадебной культуры 17 — 19 вв. — М.: Искусство, 1979.
- Веселаго Ф. Ф. Очерк истории Морского кадетского корпуса с приложением списка воспитанников за 100 лет. СПб., 1852.
- Веселовский С. Б. Акты писцового дела. Т. I. М., 1913.
- Веселовский С. Б. Исследования по истории класса служилых землевладельцев. — М., 1969.
- Веселовский С. Б. Ономастикон. Древнерусские имена, прозвища, фамилии. М., 1974.
- Вилинбахов В. Государево сыноубийство // Нева-1982.-№ 7,8,9.
- Висковатов П. А. М. Ю. Лермонтов. Жизнь и творчество. М., 1987.
- Витте С. Ю., гр. Воспоминания. Т. 3. М., 1960.
- Военно-энциклопедический словарь. — М.: Воениздат, 1982.
- Волков О. Два стольных града. М., 1994. С. 52-61.
- Вологодские ведомости, 1914.
- Воронович Н. В. Вечерний звон. Очерки прошлого. 1891—1917. Нью-Йорк, 1955. 224 с.
- Восстание в Москве 1682 года / Сборник документов. — М.: Наука, 1976.
- Врангель Н. Н., бар. Старые усадьбы. — СПб., 1999.
- ГАВО. Ф. 243. Оп. 1. Д. 80. Л. 124–125.
- ГАКО. Ф. 121. Оп. 1. Д. 1122 (1832 г.); Д. 2970 (1843 г.); Д. 2012 (1847 г.).
- ГАКО. Ф. 121. Оп. 3. Д. 151 (1866 г.); Д. 6991 (1878 г.).
- Галич Ю. И. Каушен. К 25-летию первого боя. // Новое русское слово. 1939, № 9735, 1 окт., с. 2.
- ГАРФ. Ф. 48. Оп. 1. Д. 235.
- Генеалогия баронов Мейендорфов MS.
- Генеалогия князей Трубецких MS.
- Генеалогия Осоргиных MS.
- Герасимов А. В. На лезвии с террористами. М., 1991 (Перепеч. с изд.: Paris, 1985).
- Герберштейн С. Записки о Московии. — М.: МГУ, 1988.
- Гершензон-Чегодаева Н. М. Дмитрий Григорьевич Левицкий. — М.: Искусство, 1964.
- Говоров А. А. Книжники Петровской поры. — М.: ИЗД. МПИ, 1989.
- Голицын А. В., кн. (1927). Воспоминания. Рукопись (собственность наследников).
- Голицын И. В., кн. Семь женских портретов семьи Голицыных // Хозяева и гости усадьбы Вяземы. Мат-лы Голицынских чтений 24-25 янв. 1998 г. — Б. Вяземы, 1998, с. 104—111.
- Голицын К. Н., кн. Записки / Российское Дворянское собрание. — М., I997.
- Голицын Н. Н., кн. Род князей Голицыных. — СПб., 1892.
- Голицын П. П., кн. Список дворянских родов Новгородской губернии, внесенных в дворянскую родословную книгу с 1787 г. по 1 янв. 1910 г. Новгород, 1910. XL1II, 360, LIV, 2 c.
- Голицын С. М., кн. Записки уцелевшего. М.: Орбита, 1990. 734 с.
- Голицына А. Н., кнг. Родзянко Е. Ф., Толстая О. М., гр. Переломы жизни. — США: Частное изд. Родзянко, 1991.
- Головина В. Н., гр. Мемуары (История благородной женщины) — М.: НЛО, 1996.
- ГАСО.
- Гребельский П. Х. Светлейшие князья и дворяне Лопухины // Дворянские роды Российской Империи. Т.2. Князья. Спб., 1995. Том 3. Князья. Глава «Лопухины». М, 1996.
- Греч А. Н. Венок усадьбам // Памятники Отечества. Альманах ВООПИиК. М., 1995.
- Греч А. Н. Музей во Введенском // Среди коллекционеров. М., 1922. № 7/8. С. 32-34.
- Грибанов В. И., Лурье Л. Я. Аптекарский остров. Л.: Лениздат, 1988. С. 18-19.
- Григоров А. И. Григоровы. М.: Московский издательский дом, 1999.
- Гумилев Л. Н. От Руси к России. Очерки этнической истории. М., 1992, с. 66.
- Д. А. Лопухин. [Некролог]. // Русский инвалид, 1914, 15 дек., № 291.
- Давыдов А. В. Воспоминания, изданные его дочерью О. А. Дакг, ок. 1980 г. Париж.
- Давыдов А. В. Надписи к Кулеватовским фотографиям. / Публ. М. Д. Афанасьева. // Земство (Пенза), 1994, № 1.
- Давыдов Н. В. В провинции 70-е и начало 80-х гг. //Давыдов Н. В. Из прошлого. [Ч. 1]. М., 1913, с. 185—187.
- Давыдов Н. В. Из прошлого. — М., 1914.
- Давыдов С. А. Записки старого взрывника. М., 1998. 415 с.
- Дворцовые разряды, по Высочайшему повелению изданные II отд. Собственной Е. И. В. канцелярии. Тт.1-4. — СПб,1850-55.
- Дворянские роды Российской Империи / Под ред. С. В Думина. Том II. Князья. СПб., 1995; Том III. Князья. М, 1996; Глава «Лопухины». Подготовительные материалы к главе «Лопухины», хранящиеся в личном архиве кн. В. О. Лопухина.
- Декабристы (биографический справочник) / Под ред. М. В. Нечкиной. М., 1988.
- Делиль Ж. Сады. Л.: Наука, 1987. / Предисловие и перевод А. Ф. Воейкова.
- Дело А. А. Лопухина в Особом присутствии Правительствующего Сената: Стеногр. отчёт. Спб., 1910. 116с.
- Дело о Патриархе Никоне. Издательство Археографической комиссии по документам Московской Синодальной библиотеки. Т.XXXII, СПб., 1897.
- Демидова Н. Ф. Служилая бюрократия в России XVII в. — М.: Наука, 1987.
- Державин Г. Р. Сочинения с объяснительными примечаниями Я. К. Грота, Тт. I—IХ.- СПб.,1864-1883. (Т. IV. С. 731—732.).
- Дмитриева Н. А. Краткая история искусств. — М.: Искусство, 1996.
- Долгова С. Р. Короткие рассказы о Москве. М.: Мосгорархив, 1997.
- Долгоруков И. М., кн., Капище моего сердца. Ковров, «Бэст-В», 1997.
- Долгоруков П. В. Российская родословная книга. — Санкт-Петербург: Типография Э. Веймара, 1855. — Т. 2. — С. 55.* Дом Романовых. — СПб., 1992.
- Дополнения к Актам историческим, собранные и изданные Археографической комиссиею.- Т. I. — СПб.,1846.
- Древняя Российская Вифлиофика. Изд. 2. Тт. I—XX. Б. м., 1788—1789.
- Дубицкий А. Иван Владимирович Лопухин. Историко-литературное исследование. — Казань: Типография Императорского Университета,1889.
- Дюма А. Путевые впечатления. В России. Тт. 1 — 3. М.: Ладомир, 1996.
- Евлогий (Георгиевский), митрополит. Путь моей жизни. Воспоминания. М.: Московский рабочий, 1994.
- Ельчанинов И. Н. Материалы для генеалогии ярославского дворянства. Вып. 1-5, 7-9. Ярославль, 1909 — [1916]. Загл.: вып. 3, 5, 8 — Материалы для генеалогии дворянства Ярославской губернии.
- Епанчин Н. А. На службе трёх Императоров. — М.: Наше наследие, 1996.
- Есипов А. Освобождение Царицы Евдокии Федоровны. // Русский Вестник. Т. 28.
- Есипов Г. Царица Евдокия Федоровна. М., 1866.
- Ж<уковский В. А.> Примечание к статье Ла Гарля «Фенелон, воспитатель герцога Бургонского» // Вестник Европы. 1809. № 4. С. 298—299.
- Желябужский И. А. Записки // Россия при царевне Софье и Петре I. Записки русских людей. М.: Современник. 1990.
- Жилецкое землевладение 1632 г. //Летопись Историко-родословного общества в Москве, Вып. 3-4, 1912.
- Житие Петра Великого Императора и Самодержца Всероссийского Отца Отечества (перевод с греческого).- М.,1782.
- Забелин И. Е. Домашний быт русских царей в XVI—XVII столетиях. — М.: Книга, 1990.
- Иванов А. Дома и люди. Из истории петербургских особняков. — СПб.: Лениздат, I997.
- Иванов П. И. Алфавитный указатель фамилий и лиц, упоминаемых в боярских книгах, хранящихся в 1-м отд. Московского архива Министерства юстиции. — М., 1853. С. 238—240 (Лопухины).
- Иванова Т. А. Юность Лермонтова. М., 1957.
- Иванчин-Писарев Н. Спасо-Андроников монастырь. М., 1842.
- Историческое исследование о местоположении древнего Российского Тмутараканского Княжения. — СПб.,1794.
- Историческое описание Мещовского Георгиевского мужского общежительного монастыря. Сост. А. Л. в 1864 году. М., 1870. С. 19-20.
- История Правительствующего Сената за 200 лет. Т. 4. Спб., 1911.529 с.
- История Российского законодательства. Т. 5. — М.: Юриздат, 1990.
- История русского искусства. — М.: Наука, 1961. Т.VII; 1964, Т. VIII.
- История русского искусства / Под. ред. И. Э Грабаря. М.: Искусство, 1961—1966.
- История Украинской ССР. — Киев: Наукова думка, 1982.
- Кабалкин Г. Благородство обязывает // Газета Литератор. — СПб., 1991, № 41.
- Каждан Т. П. Художественный мир русской усадьбы. М.: Традиция, 1998.
- Казанина О. Русские в Англии. — М.: Наследие, 1997.
- Казанский П. С. Родословная Головиных. М., 1847.
- Как жил в ссылке в г. Коле Степан Иванович Лопухин // Архангельские губернские ведомости,-1872. — № 67-76.
- Калуга VI — шестая часть Родословной книги Калужского депутатского дворянского собрания.
- Каменский Л. Б. К вопросу о родословных росписях конца XVII в. // Вспомогательные исторические дисциплины. Л., 1990. № XXI.
- Каменский А. Б. Новые данные о судьбе родословных росписей конца XVII в. // Генеалогические исследования. М., 1994.
- Карабанов П. Ф. Списки замечательных лиц русских. — СПб.,1860.
- Карамзин Н. М. История государства Российского в 12-ти томах. Т. 2. М., 1991, с. 16, 200.
- Карнаухова Л., Руднева А. На фоне Пушкина... / Ж. Сельская молодёжь. 1991, № 6. С. 34-35.
- Карнович Е. П. Родовые прозвания и титулы в России и слияние иноземцев с русскими. — СПб.: Изд. А. С. Суворина, 1886.
- Касоги // Советская историческая энциклопедия. Т.7. М., 1965, с. 86.
- Кашкин Н. Н. Родословные разведки. Посмертное издание. Тт. 1 — 2. СПб., 1912—1913.
- Ключевский В. О. Исторические портреты. — М.: Правда, 1990.
- Ключевский В. О. Курс русской истории. — М.: СЭГ. Тт. 1-4. 1956.
- Ключевский В. О. Сочинения. — М., 1959.
- Князьков С. Из прошлого русской земли. Время Петра Великого. — М., 1911.
- Кондратьев И. М. Седая старина Москвы. М.: Изд. Морозова, 1893.
- Коновницын А. П. Памяти незабвенного друга // Дворянское собрание. — М., 1995. № 2, с. 251—254.
- Кормленая книга Галицкой четверти 7121-25 годов.// ЧОИДР. — М., 1912.
- Коробко М. Ю. Усадьба Узкое. М.: АН, 1996.
- Коробко М. Ю. Ясенево // Усадебное ожерелье юго-запада Москвы. М.: Мосгорархив, 1997. С.151-153.
- Корсакова Т. Потомки чести // газета Комсомольская правда, — 1991. — 9 января.
- Корсунь Шевченковский. Альбом. Киев, 1973.
- Костомаров Н. И. Исторические монографии и исследования. Царевна Софья. Царевич Алексей Петрович. Самодержавный отрок. — М.: Книга, 1990.
- Кострома VI — шестая Часть Родословной книги Костромского депутатского дворянского собрания.
- Краснова Е. И. Демидовы. Родословная роспись. — Екатеринбург, 1992.
- Краткое родословное показание ныне здравствующих дворянских фамилий Лопухиных, Волынских, Воейковых..., сочиненное на лето 1798-е. М., 1798. 14 с.
- Крюковских А. П. Дворцы Санкт-Петербурга.- СПб.: Петиздат, I997.
- Кто есть кто в современном мире (кн. Лопухин В. О.) / Международный объединенный биографический центр. Вып. 2. — М., 1999. С. 245—246.
- Курдюмов М. Г. Описание актов, хранящихся в архиве Археографической комиссии. Коллекции.//Летопись занятий Археографической комиссии за 1918 г. Вып. XXXI. СПб., 1923.
- Лапшина Н. Федор Степанович Рокотов. — М.: Искусство, 1959.
- Лермонтов М. Ю. Письма к А. А. Лопухину // Лермонтов М. Ю. Собрание сочинений в 6-ти т. Т. 6. М., 1950, с. 466—467.
- Лермонтов М. Ю. ПСС. СПб.: Изд. Имп. АН, 1910. Т. 2.
- Лермонтовская энциклопедия. М., «Советская энциклопедия», 1981.
- Лихачев Н. П. Государев Родословец и Бархатная Книга. — СПб., 1900.
- Лихачев Н. П. Государев родословец и род Адашевых. СПб.,1897.
- Лобанов-Ростовский А. Б., кн. Русская родословная книга. Тт. 1 — 2. СПб., 1873—1875.
- Лопухин А. // Русская энциклопедия. Т. 11. Пгр., [Б. г.], с. 348.
- Лопухин А. А. Докладная записка директора Департамента полиции Лопухина, рассмотренная в Комитете министров... / С предисл. В. Ленина. М., Женева, 1905. 13 с.
- Лопухин А. А. Из итогов служебного опыта: Настоящее и будущее русской полиции. М., 1907. 73 с.
- Лопухин А. А. Настоящее и будущее русской полиции. — М., 1907.
- Лопухин А. А. Отрывки из воспоминаний. — М.-Пг.: Госиздат, 1923.
- Лопухин А. П. Библейская история Ветхого и Нового завета. — Б. м.: Изд. Свято-Троицкой Лавры, 1998. (репринт).
- Лопухин А. П. Библейская история в свете новейших исследований и открытий. — Тт. 1 — 3. СПб., 1892—1895.
- Лопухин В. Б. Люди и политика. (Конец XIX -начало XX в.) // Вопр. истории, 1966, № 9, с. 120—126, № 10, с. 110—122, № 11, с. 116—128. (Биогр. справка в № 9).
- Лопухин В. Б. После 25 октября. // Минувшее /Исторический альманах. — М.: Прогресс: Феникс, 1990.- С.9-99.
- Лопухин В. О. // Лики возрождения. Современная российская элита. / Энциклопедия. — М.: Витязь, 1998. С. 137—138.
- Лопухин Д. А. [Некролог] // Русский Инвалид, 1914, 15 декабря.
- Лопухин И. В. Записки сенатора. — М.: Наука, 1990.
- Лопухин И. В. Искатель премудрости или духовный рыцарь. — СПб.: Алетейя, 1998.
- Лопухин И. В. Некоторые черты о внутренней церкви. — СПб., 18I6.
- Лопухин М. С. [Биогр. справка]. // Московское городское братское кладбище. Опыт биогр. словаря. М., 1992, с. 41.
- Лопухин О. М. В рейсах на «Диксоне».// Северные конвои. Исследования, воспоминания, документы. -Архангельск, 1991.-С.101-106.
- Лопухин О. М. О рейсе на «Диксоне». Архангельск. 1991.
- Лопухин П. В. // Ярославские губернаторы. — Ярославль: Изд. ЯрГУ, 1994.
- Лопухин П. С. Беседы с Епископом Гавриилом. — Словацкая республика: Типография Владимирова, 1940.
- Лопухин П. С. Святая Русь и Русское государство. — Мюнхен, 1950.
- Лопухин С. А. Вернейшим из верных (избранные речи и стихотворения).- Нью-Йорк, 1979.
- Лопухин С. В. // Берх В. Жизнеописание первых российских адмиралов. Т 2. — М., 1832
- Лопухин С. Н. Воспоминания. Рукопись. 1960-е гг.
- Лопухина-Родзянко Т. А. Духовные основы творчества Солженицына. Франкфурт на Майне: Посев, 1974. 180 с. (Портрет и биогр. справка на 4 стр. обложки.).
- Лопухина-Родзянко Т. А. Судьба семьи С. А. Лопухина. 1999 г. Рукопись.
- Лопухины, дворянский род // Справочный энциклопедический словарь. Т. 7. СПб., 1853, с.281-283.
- Лопухины // Русский энциклопедический словарь. Т. 9. [Б. м., Б. г.], с. 486.
- Лопухины // Энциклопедический словарь Брокгауз, Эфрон. Т. XVIII. Спб, 1898, с. 9-10.
- Лопухины. 500 лет служения Московскому Великому Княжеству, Царству, Российской Империи. (Историко — генеалогические заметки) // Дворянское собрание. № 2. М., 1995, с. 177—193.
- Лотман Ю. М. Беседы о русской культуре. М.: ACT, I997.
- Лубяновский Ф. П. Воспоминания.// РА 1872.
- Лукомский В. К. Собрание гербовых печатей Н. Ф. Романченко. // Гербовед, Спб., 1913, Июль, с. 118—121.
- Лукомский В. К. Эмблематический гербовник. С рис. А. А. Толоконникова // Геральдика. Материалы и исследования. Л., 1987. С. 131—168.
- Лурье Ф. Азеф и Лопухин // Нева, 1990, № 9, с. 165—176.
- Лурье Ф. М. Полицейские и провокаторы: Политический сыск в России. СПб., 1992, с. 347—351.
- Львов Г. Е., кн. Воспоминания. М.: Русский путь, 1998.
- Любимов С. В. Предводители дворянства всех наместничеств, губерний и областей Российской империи. 1777—1910. СПб., 1911.
- М. Ю. Лермонтов в воспоминаниях современников. — М.: Художественная литература, 1989.
- Майков В. В. Книга писцовая по Новгороду Великому конца XVI в. СПб., 1911.
- Малинин Д. Калуга. Опыт исторического путеводителя по Калуге и главнейшим центрам губернии. — Калуга, 1912.
- Мануйлов В. А. Лермонтов в Петербурге. Л., 1964.
- Масонские труды И. В. Лопухина. — М.: Изд. В. Саводника, 1913.
- Масонство в его прошлом и настоящем / Под ред. С. П. Мельгунова и Н. П. Сидорова. — Тт. 1-2. М.: Задруга, 1914—1915.
- Массон Ш. Секретные записки о России. — М.: НЛО, 1996.
- Мейендорф М. Ф., бар. Воспоминания. — США: Частное изд. Родзянко, 1990.
- Мейерберг А., бар. Путешествие в Московию. Альбом рисунков. Б. м., 1662.
- Мережковский Д. С. Антихрист // ПСС в 5 т. — СПб. — М.: Изд. Т-ва Вольф. 1910—1915.
- Местнический справочник XVII века изд. Ю. В. Татищевым. Вильнюс, 1910 (то же — М., 1910), VIII, 106 с.
- Месяцеслов с росписью чиновных особ на лето 1796 года. — М. ,1796.
- Миллер Ц. Г. Загадочное письмо М. Ю. Лермонтова. // Наука в России, 1994, № 5, с. 56-58.
- Миндлин А. Б. «Чужие среди своих». М., 1997. 11 с.
- Мир русской усадьбы / Сб. статей. — М.: Наука, 1995.
- Миттерних Т., кнг. Женщина с пятью паспортами. — СПб.: Алетейя, 1999.
- Молева Н. М. Земли московской давние преданья. М.: Московский рабочий, 1985. С. 26-37.
- Молева Н. М. Усадьбы Москвы. — М.: Информпечать, 1998.
- Москва родословная. Сб. — М.: Москва, 1998.
- Москва. Энциклопедия. — М.: БСЭ, 1980.
- Московский университет в воспоминаниях современников. — М.: Современник, 1989.
- Московское дворянство. Алфавитный список дворянских родов. Списки служивших по выборам. 1782—1910. М., 1910.
- Моя Москва / Каталог выставки к 850-летию Москвы. — М., 1997.
- Музей истории Корсунь-Щевченковской битвы. Путеводитель. Днепропетровск, 1976.
- Мулукаев Р. С. Организация полицейской службы в России. Текст доклада. Рукопись. 1999.
- Нечволодов А. Сказание о русской земле. Тт. 1 — 2. СПб., 1913.
- Николева М. Ф. М. Ю. Лермонтов. Жизнь и творчество. М., 1956.
- Новгородские записные кабальные книги 100—104 гг. М. — Л., 1938.
- Новгородские писцовые книги, изданные археографической комиссией. Т.I. Переписная оброчная книга Деревской пятины. СПб., 1859; Т. II. СПб., 1862.
- Новиков В. И. Масонские парки Подмосковья // Русская усадьба. Сборник ОИРУ. Вып. 5 (21). М.: «Жираф», 1999. С.234.
- Новое время — газета, издававшаяся в Петербурге в 1871—1917 гг.
- Общий гербовник дворянских родов Российской Империи, начатый в 1797 г. Ч. 3, 4. Спб., [1800].
- Общий морской список. Т. I. СПб., 1885.
- Описание Москвы и её достопримечательностей. — М.,1850.
- Орёл VI — шестая Часть Родословной книги Орловского депутатского дворянского собрания.
- Орловская область. Каталог памятников архитектуры. М., 1985. С. 180—182.
- Островский А. З. Родственные связи А. А. Лопухина (1864—1928) // Из глубины времен. Вып. 6. — / Спб., 1996, с. 191—214.
- От губернатора до мэра / Сб. статей. — М.; Мосгорархив, 1997.
- Отечественная история. Энциклопедия. — М.: Изд. БРЭ. Тт 1-3. 1994—2000.
- П. Департамент полиции в 1892—1908 гг. (Из воспоминаний чиновника). // Былое. 1917, № 5/6, с. IP-24.
- Павло Петрович Лопухiн// Полякова Т. Ю. Власники Корсуннського Маетку. — Корсунський Часопис. — 1996. № 4. С. 36-39.
- Павлова Л. К. Из опыта охраны памятников истории и культуры Подмосковья // Спасти и сохранить. — М.: Знание, 1990. — C. 30-38.
- Памяти П. С. Лопухина. Сб. материалов. — Париж: Православное дело, 1967.
- Памятная книжка на 1914 г. — Тула, 1914.
- Памятная книжка и адрес-календарь Калужской губернии на 1915 г. Калуга, 1915.
- Памятники архитектуры Костромской области. Каталог. Вып 1., Ч.1. — Кострома, 1996.
- Памятники архитектуры Ленинграда. Л., 1975. С. 132.
- Памятники Архитектуры Москвы. Белый город. — М.: Искусство, 1989.
- Памятники архитектуры Москвы. Земляной город. — М.: Искусство, 1989.
- Памятники архитектуры Московской области. Т. 1-2. М., 1975.
- Памятники и виды Киевской, Подольской и Волынской губерний. Сад в местечке Корсунь. — Вып. 2. Киев, 1858.
- Памятники искусства Тульской губ. — Тула, 1912—1914. Вып. 1-2.
- Панчулидзев С. А. История кавалергардов. 1724—1799 — 1899. Тт. 1- 1. СПб., 1899—1912.
- Панчулидзев С. А. Сборник биографий кавалергардов. Т. 1-3. Спб., 1901—1903.
- Пахомов Н. П. Подруга юных дней. (Варенька Лопухина). М., 1975. 24 с.
- Песков А. М. Павел I / Ж3Л. — М.: Молодая гвардия, 1999.
- Петербург / Энциклопедия. Л.: Лениздат, 1984.
- Петро Васильович Лопухiн // Полякова Т. Ю. Власники Корсунського Маетку. — Корсунський Часопис. — 1996. № 3. С. 36-39.
- Петров П. Н. История родов русского дворянства. Кн. 1 — 2. Спб., 1886 (Репринт — М., 1991).
- Петров П. Н. Лопухины, князья и дворяне. // Петров П. Н. Для немногих. Вып. 1. СПб., 1871. 371 с.
- Петрункевич И. И. Из записок общественного деятеля. Воспоминания. // Архив русской революции. М., 1993. Т. 21, с. 149, 151, 194, 287—288, 293.
- По лермонтовским местам. — Тт. 1 — 2. М.: Искусство, 1989.
- Повесть временных лет. — М.: Наука / Литературные памятники, 1950.
- Под скипетром Романовых. // Родина. — 1913. — № 7.
- Подмосковье / Сост. Ильин М. А. — М.: Искусство, 1965.
- Подмосковье. Сб. статей. — М.: Московский рабочий, 1955.
- Полежаев П. В. Лопухинское дело. Историческая повесть времен Елизаветы Петровны.- М.: Сов. Писатель: Олимп, 1992.
- Полный список шефов, полковых командиров и офицеров Лейб-гвардии Конного полка с 1731 по 1888 глд. — СПб., 1886.
- Половинкин С. М., Флоренский П. В. Гнездо черносотенцев под Москвой // День. М., 1992, № 5.
- Полунина К., Фролов А. Коллекционеры старой Москвы. — М.: Нез. газ., I997.
- Попов А. И. К истории имени «Редедя» // Вопросы кавказской филологии и истории. Вып. 1. Нальчик, 1982, с. 38-42.
- Портретная миниатюра в России XVIII—XIX вв. — Б. м.: Художник РФ, 1988.
- Похилевич Л. И. Сказания о населенных местностях Киевской губернии, или статистические, исторические и церковные заметки. — Киев, 1864. С. 371—378.
- Просим освободить из тюремного заключения". Письма в защиту репрессированных. М., 1998, с. 172.
- Пшеничный И. П. Отечества достойные сыны. — СПб., 1995.
- Пыляев М. И. Драгоценные камни. — СПб.: Изд. Суворина, 1888.
- Пыляев М. И. Забытое прошлое окрестностей Петербурга. СПб.: Лениздат, 1996. С.46-48, 503.
- Пыляев М. И. Старая Москва. — М.: Московский рабочий, 1990.
- Пыляев М. И. Старый Петербург. — СПб.: Изд. Суворина, 1889.
- Разрядный приказ. Опись столбцов дополнительного отдела. — М., 1950.
- Расловлев М. Памяти П. С. Лопухина // Русское слово. — Париж, 08.09.1962.
- РГАДА. Новгород старых лет. — Кн.3., д. 8; Кн. 20, д. 1.
- Род дворян Поливановых XIV—XX вв. — Владимир на Клязьме, 1902.
- Родословие дворян и князей Лопухиных // Всемирная иллюстрация. Т. VI, № 151, 1871.
- Родословная книга князей и дворян российских и выезжих (Бархатная книга). М., 1787.
- Родословная книга летописной редакции // Редкие источники по истории России. — Вып. I. — М., 1977. С. 68 — 69.
- Романюк С. Из истории московских переулков. М.: Сварог, 1998.
- Романюк С. По землям московских сел и слобод. М., 1998.
- Роспись детей боярских Мещовска, Опакова и Брянска 1584 г. // Археографический Ежегодник за 1972 г. / Публ. А. Л. Станиславского — М., 1974.
- Российская Государственная библиотека. Отдел рукописей, ф. 303, д. 521.
- Российские консерваторы. Сб. статей. — М.: Русский мир, 1997.
- Российский Архив. — М.: Студия ТриТЭ, 1994.
- Российский энциклопедический словарь. — М.: Изд. БРЭ, М., 2000.
- Россия глазами иностранцев. Сб. 1 — 5. — СПб.: Лениздат, 1992—1997.
- Руделев В. «Иже зареза Редедю пред пълки касожскыми...»// Ясная Поляна, 1992, № 1, с. 207—208.
- Руммель В. В., Голубцов В. В. Родословный сборник русских дворянских фамилий. — Т. 2. СПб.,1887.
- Русская генеалогия / Под ред. Николаева Б. А. — М.: Богородский Печатник, 1999.
- Русская историческая песня / Сборник. — Л.: Сов. писатель, 1990.
- Русская старина. Сб. 1 — 3. М.: Новости, 1992, 1994.
- Русские мемуары. Вып. 1 — 4. — М.: Правда, 1989-90.
- Русские портреты 18 и 19 столетий. Тт. 1–5. СПб.: Изд. Вел. Кн. Николая Михайловича, 1905—1909.
- Русский биографический словарь. — СПб.,1896 — 1913 [Тт. 1 — 25].
- Савелов Л. М. Народные и родовые легенды // Союз дворян. — Париж, 1991.- № 37-38.
- Саитов В. И. Великий Князь Николай Михайлович. Московский некрополь. Тт. I—III. — СПб, 1907.
- Салтыков-Щедрин М. Е. Первая русская передвижная художественная выставка // М. Е. Салтыков- Щедрин об искусстве. М. — Л. 1949 г.
- Самоквасов Д. Я. Архивный материал. — Т. II. — М., 1909.
- Светлейший князь П. П. Лопухин. 1788—1873. [Некролог] // РС, 1973. — Т. VII, май. — С. 728—730.
- Семевский М. И. Евдокия Федоровна Лопухина // Русский вестник.-1859. — № 3.
- Семевский М. И. Наталия Федоровна Лопухина. — М.: Типография Каткова, 1860.
- Семевский М. И. Павловск. — СПб.: Изд. В. К. Константина Николаевича, 1889.
- Семевский М. И. Покровский Девичий монастырь в г. Суздале. Место заточения А. Ф. Лопухиной. — М., 1860.
- Сиверс А. А. Родословие Озеровых // Известия Русского генеалогического общества. Спб., 1908. Вып. 3. Отд. II, с. 203—364.
- Словарь русских генералов. — М., 1996.
- Слово о полку Игореве. — М.: Наука / Литературные памятники, 1950.
- Слуцкий М. Б. В скорбные дни: Кишиневский погром 1903 г. Кишинев, 1930. 119 с.
- Согласие — 1978, сентябрь, № 324 (США, Лос-Анджелес).
- Соловьев Вс. С. Юный Император. — М.: СП Эврика, 1990.
- Соловьев С. М. История России с древнейших времен. — М.: Мысль, 1991.
- Соловьев С. М. Публичные чтения о Петре Великом. — М.: Наука, 1980.
- Сорок сороков. Краткая иллюстрированная история всех московских храмов. Собр. Петр Паламарчук. Кремль и монастыри. Том 1. М.: АО «Книга и бизнес», 1992. С. 180, 202, 228, 294.
- Спиридонов М. Г. Сокращенное описание служб благородных российских дворян. Ч. 1. М., 1810.
- Списки титулованным родам Российской Империи. — СПб., 1892.
- Список стрелецких голов и сотников // Тысячная книга и Дворовая тетрадь пятидесятых годов XVI в. — М. — Л., 1950.
- Стасов В. В. Брауншвейгское семейство. — Б. М.: Сев.-Зап. кн. издат., 1993.
- Стасов В. В. Передвижная выставка 1871 года. // Избр. соч. в двух томах. Т. I. М.-Л, 1950.
- Стасов В. В., сост. Ге Н. И., его жизнь, произведения и переписка. — Б. м., 1904.
- Статистическое описание Киевской губернии, изданное тайным советником, сенатором Фундуклеем. СПб, 1852. T.I. С. 512—517.
- Суровцев А. Г. Иван Владимирович Лопухин / Биографический очерк. — СПб., 1901.
- Сухотина-Толстая Т. Л. Воспоминания. М., 1976.
- Сухотина-Толстая Т. Л. Старушка Шмидт // Сухотина-Толстая Т. Л. Воспоминания. М., 1980.
- Сушкова Е. А. Записки. 1812—1841. Л., 1928. 446 с.
- Сытин П. В. История планировки и застройки г. Москвы. Материалы и исследования. Том 1. М., 1950; Том 2. М., 1954.
- Таубе М А., бар. К истории герба Дома Романовых (догадка о происхождении Романовского грифа) // Гербовед. 1913. С. 109—117.
- Толковая Библия или комментарий на все книги Святого Писания Ветхого и Нового Завета. Издание преемников А. П. Лопухина. Тт. 1 −12. — Б. м. — 1904—1913.
- Трегубов М. И. Алфавитный список дворянских родов Владимирской губ. — Владимир, 1905.
- Троицкий Н. И. Тульский Успенский женский монастырь. — Тула, 1913.
- Трубецкая Е. Э., кнг. Сказание о роде князей Трубецких. М., 1891, с. 263—264.
- Трубецкая О. Н., кнг. Отрывки из семейной хроники. (Публикация И. С. Чистовой // Рус. литература. 1990, № 2.
- Трубецкой B.C., кн. Записки кирасира. М., 1991, с.16, 198.
- Трубецкой А. Е., кн. История одной попытки. (Янв. -февр. 1918 г.) // Россия воспрянет: Князья Трубецкие. М., 1996, с. 519—526.
- Трубецкой Е. Н., кн. Из прошлого. — Вена: Книгоиздательство «Русь», 1923.
- Трубецкой Е. Н., кн. Из прошлого // Россия воспрянет. Князья Трубецкие. М., 1996, с. 16-20.
- Трубецкой Н. С., кн. Редедя на Кавказе // Этногр. обозрение, 1911. Кн. 88-89, № 1-2, с. 220—238.
- Тульские губернаторы / Редкол.: Кораблева Л. И., Морозова Е. М. и др. — Тула, 1997.
- Турчанинов Г. Летописный Редедя и черкесское «рэдадэ». (К истории одного варианта сказания о Ляшин). // Кабардинский науч.-исслед. Ин-т. Учёные записки. Т. 2. Нальчик, 1947, с. 237—282.
- Тысячная Книга 1550 года и Дворовая тетрадь 50-х годов XVI века. — М.-Л., 1950.
- Улица Фрунзе // Вопросы истории, 1978, № 9. С. 214—218.
- Урания. — Калуга, 1804.
- Усадебное ожерелье Москвы. — М.: Мосгорархив, 1996.
- Усадьба Савинская // Журн. Щелково, 1999, № 2. С. 6 — 10.
- Федосюк А. Москва в кольце садовых. — М.: Московский рабочий, 1985.
- Фехнер М. В. Калуга. М., 1971.
- Формулярный список о службе и. о. директора Департамента полиции статс. советника А. А. Лопухина. // Из глубины времен. Вып. 6. Спб., 1996, с. 176—179.
- Фрейман О., фон. Пажи за 185 лет (1711—1896). — Фридриксгамн, 1894—1897.
- Фролов А. И. Частные коллекции дворянских усадеб // Русские усадьбы. Вып 2. М.: Аиро-ХХ, 1996.
- Фролов Н. В. Род Хоненевых // Владимирский Родословец. — Вып. I. — Ковров: Изд. ТОО «Бэст-В», 1996.
- Хитрово В. С. Род дворян Хитрово. — Б. м., 1886.
- Хмелевская Е. М. Лопухин А. А. // Лермонтовская энциклопедия. М., 1999, с. 265.
- Хмелевская Е. М. Лопухина М. А. // Лермонтовская энциклопедия. М., 1999, с.266.
- Хмелевская Е. М. Лопухины // Лермонтовская энциклопедия. М., 1999, с. 266.
- Холмогорова В. И. Исторические материалы о церквях и селах Московской епархии. Вып. 3. — М., 1886.
- Христианство. Энциклопедический словарь. — М.: Изд. БРЭ. Тт. 1 — 3. 1993.
- Хроника семьи Зерновых. В 3-х т. Т. 3, ч. 1-4. Paris, 1981. 177 с.
- Цареубийство 11 марта 1801 года (записки участников и современников).- СПб.: изд. Суворина, 1907.
- ЦГИА. Боярская книга Поместного приказа 1648 года.
- Чебышев Н. Н. Близкая даль: Воспоминания. — Париж, 1933. 370 с.
- Чекалина Л. Успешный поиск //газета Московский Художник. — М., 1984.- № 43.
- Черепнин Н. П. Императорское общество благородных девиц. Исторический очерк. 1764—1914. Тт. 1 — 3. — СПб.-Птг., 1914—1915. Приложение к т. 3.
- Чернигов VI — шестая Часть Родословной Книги Черниговского депутатского дворянского собрания.
- Чернов А. В. Вооружённые силы русского государства в XV—XVII вв. — М., 1954.
- Чернопятов В. И. Дворянское сословие Тульской губернии. Т. 3 (12). Ч. 6. М., [1909]. 48 с.; Т. 4 (13). 1910; Т. IX (XVIII). М, 1912.
- Чернявский М. П. Генеалогия господ дворян Тверской губернии [с 1787 по 1869 г.]. Тверь, 1869.
- Шан-Гирей А. П. М. Ю. Лермонтов // М. Ю. Лермонтов в воспоминаниях современников. М., 1972, с. 31-55.
- Иванов П. Опыт биографии генерал-прокуроров и министров юстиции. — СПб., 1863. С. 116.
- Шедевры живописи музеев СССР. Вып. 2. М.: Гознак, 1976.
- Шервуд В. С. Архитектурный ансамбль Марсова поля. Л.: Искусство, 1989.
- Шереметев В. П., гр. Шереметевы. — М., 1913.
- Шереметев С. Д., гр. Введенское. М., 1900.
- Шереметевский В. Н. Великий Князь Николай Михайлович. Русский провинциальный некрополь. — Т. I. — М., 1914.
- Шортанов А. Т. Редада и Мстислав // Филологические труды. Нальчик, 1977, с. 3-42.
- Шумаков С. А. Обзор грамот Коллегии Экономии. Ч. I. Дмитров // Чтения в Обществе истории и древностей Российских. 1912. Кн. III.
- Эйхенбаум Б. М. Статьи о Лермонтове. М.-Л., 1961, с. 69.
- Ювеналий (Воейков), игумен Краткое историческое родословие знаменитых и благородных дворян Лопухиных.- М.: Типография Селивановского и товарища, 1796.
- Югра — Тюмень, № 12, 1995.
- Яковлев Е. Галерея скитальцев // газета Известия. — 1982.
- Янин В. Л. Новгородские посадники. — М., 1962.

=== Other ===
- (in French) Almanach de St. Petersbourg Cour. Monde et Ville... [1910 — 1914]. — St.Petersbourg — Leipzig, 1910—1914.
- (in French) Dolgorukow P. Memoires du prince Pierre Dolgorukow. T. 1, 1-ere livre. Geneve, 1867, Сh. З.
- (in Polish) Gorzynski В., Kochunowski J. Herby szlachty polskiej. Warszawa. 1990.
- (in French) Ikonnikov N. La Noblesse de Russie. Recueile genealogique. T. F1. Les Lopoukhine. Paris, 1932. 35 p.
- (in German) Kleinschmidt A. Russland Geschichte und Politik... Cassel, 1877. XVI, 560 S.
- (in German) Oswalt. G. Lexikon Heraldik. Leipzig, 1984.
- Our Family's Album (A genealogical and photographic Chronicle of the descendants of Prince Nicolai Petrovich Troubetzkoy (1828—1900)). — Seaclif, New-York, 1995.
- Roosevelt Priscilla. Life on the Russian Country Estate. A social and Cultural History.
- The Duke's Leuchtenberg Ancestry and Relationships. The Lopukhins. N.-Y., 1980. Chart L.
- (in Italian) Tzocca, Madame La Coque (T.I. Lopukhine)/ Ricordi E Diari (1914—1921)/ Parte I. Dal Giugno 1914 al Gemnaio 1917. Parte II. Gli Albori della Rivoluzione Russa e del Bolscevismo (1917—1918). Рукопись на итальянском языке, датированная февр. 1944 г. Хранится у кн. В. О. Лопухина.
