= Grand Duchess Natalya Alexeyevna of Russia =

Grand Duchess of Russia (1714–1728)

Grand Duchess Natalya Alexeyevna
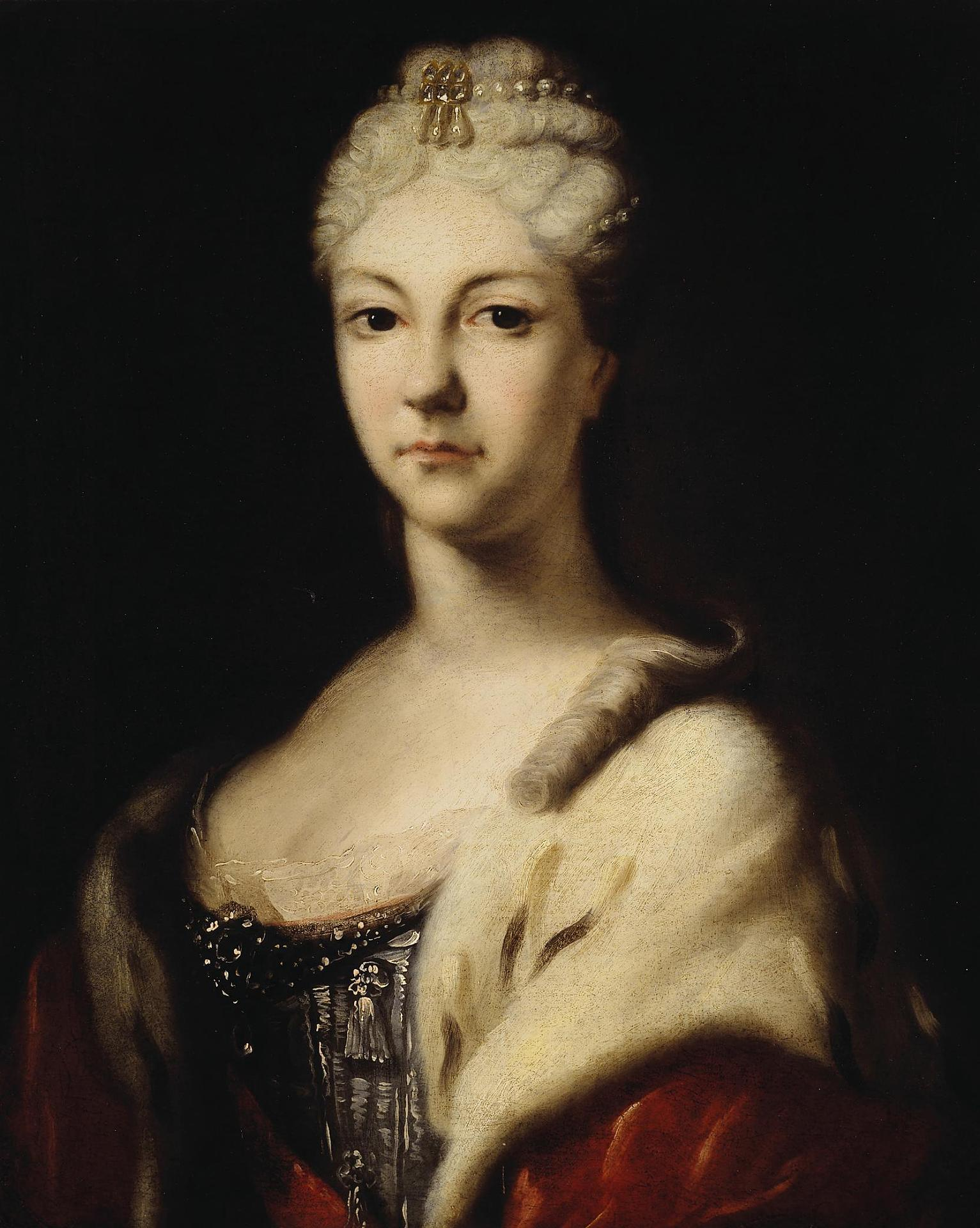
- Portrait by Ivan Nikitin, 1720s
- Born: 21 July 1714; Saint Petersburg, Russia
- Died: 22 November 1728 (aged 14); Moscow, Russia
- Burial: Peter and Paul Cathedral
- House: Romanov
- Father: Alexei Petrovich, Tsarevich of Russia
- Mother: Duchess Charlotte Christine of Brunswick-Wolfenbüttel

Grand Duchess Natalya Alexeyevna of Russia (Russian: Наталья Алексеевна; 21 July 1714 – 22 November 1728) was a grand duchess of Russia. She was the elder sister of Emperor Peter II of Russia.

== Life ==
Natalya Alexeyvna was born in Saint Petersburg on 21 July 1714 as the daughter of Alexei Petrovich, Tsarevich of Russia and his wife, Charlotte Christine of Brunswick-Wolfenbüttel. After the death of her father, she and her brother were moved to the Russian royal court in 1719, where they were raised under the supervision of Anna Ivanovna Kramer.

Her brother became monarch in 1727, and Natalya thus became an heir to the throne after her aunts Elizabeth and Anna. She became a center of attention, and Prince Menshikov wished to have her married to his son. Natalya was described as intelligent and kind, and was considered a good influence on her brother, who was very close to her.

She died in Moscow at the age of 14 due to complications with tuberculosis, unmarried and without issue.
