= Alexei Petrovich, Tsarevich of Russia =

Russian Tsarevich (1690–1718)

Alexei Petrovich
- Tsarevich of Russia
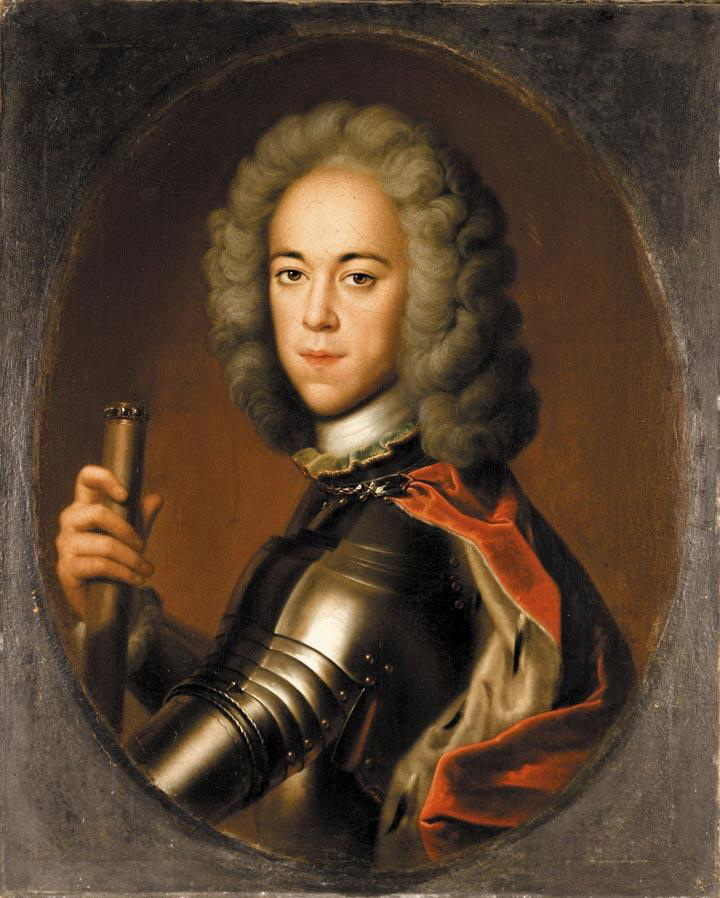
- Born: 28 February 1690; Moscow, Tsardom of Russia
- Died: 26 June 1718 (aged 28); Petropavlovskaya Fortress, St. Petersburg, Tsardom of Russia
- Spouse: Duchess Charlotte Christine of Brunswick-Wolfenbüttel (m. 1711; died 1715)
- Issue: Grand Duchess Natalya Alexeyevna of Russia; Peter II of Russia
- House: Romanov
- Father: Peter I of Russia
- Mother: Eudoxia Lopukhina

Alexei Petrovich Romanov (Russian: Алексей Петрович; 28 February 1690 – 26 June 1718), was the Tsarevich of Russia, the eldest son of Tsar Peter I and his first wife, Eudoxia Lopukhina.

Alexei, who was heir apparent to the Russian throne, frequently clashed with his father, opposing Peter’s Westernizing reforms and efforts to groom Alexei as his successor. The tension between father and son culminated in Alexei's brief escape to Austria, an act that gravely offended Peter and led to severe repercussions for Alexei and his supporters. Alexei was arrested upon his return to Russia and died following interrogation, which included torture.

Recent scholarship portrays Alexei in a more nuanced light, moving beyond the view of him as merely a victim of court intrigue. Instead, he is depicted as a figure caught between Peter’s reformist vision and traditionalist forces in the Russian elite. Historian Simon Dixon emphasizes that Alexei’s conservative stance was not simply a reactionary opposition but was shaped by social, political, and familial pressures.

His death left his infant half-brother, Peter Petrovich (son of Peter I and his second wife Catherine), assuming the title of Tsarevich, thus becoming the new heir to the Russian throne.

== Early life and education ==
Alexei Petrovich was born on February 28, 1690 in Moscow to Tsar Peter I of Russia and his first wife, Eudoxia Lopukhina. His father was preoccupied with state affairs and with his mistresses, so Alexei's early upbringing was primarily supervised by his mother.

In 1698, Peter divorced Eudoxia and confined her in a convent in Suzdal, assuming control over his son's upbringing. Alexei, who had been educated by tutor Vyazemsky from the ages of six to nine, was placed under the care of educated foreigners selected by his father, who taught him history, geography, mathematics, and French.

== Military career ==
In 1703, as part of his education, Alexei served as a private in an artillery regiment during the Great Northern War. The following year, he was present at the capture of Narva, which sparked his interest in archaeology and ecclesiology.

The Tsar expected his son and heir to be prepared for responsibilities he would assume as Tsar, including, from Peter's perspective, continuing westernizing reforms and safeguarding Peter's changes to date. Peter rarely attended to Alexei personally, and delegated Tsarevich's care and education to tutors, court officials and members of the Orthodox clergy. It has been argued that conservative elements within the court, military and clergy may have contributed to Alexei's skepticism toward his father's reforms.

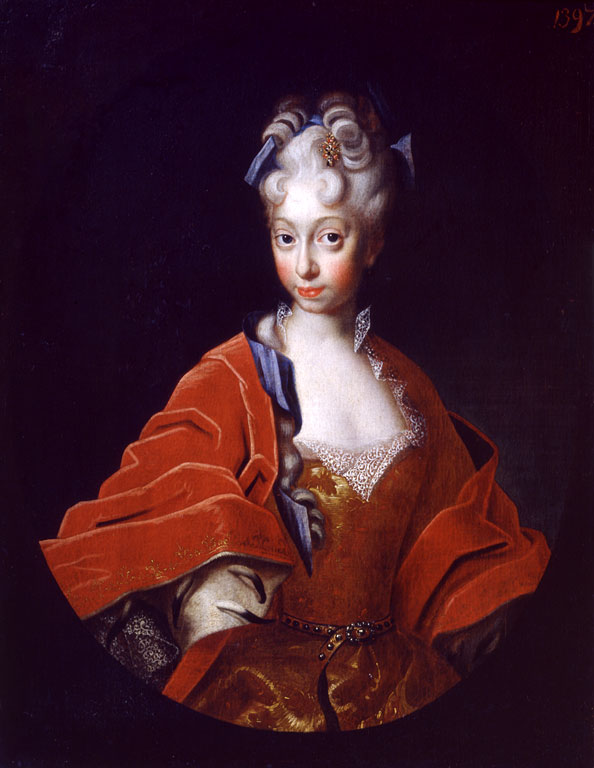
Charlotte Christine, Tsarevna of Russia

In 1708, Peter sent Alexei to Smolensk to collect supplies and recruits. Soon after, Alexei was dispatched to Moscow to fortify it against Charles XII of Sweden during the Swedish invasion of Russia. At the end of 1709, Alexei lived in Dresden for one year, where he completed lessons in French, German, mathematics, and military fortifications.

== Marriage and children ==
After concluding his education, Alexei was urged by his father to meet and marry Princess Charlotte of Brunswick-Wolfenbüttel. Charlotte's family was connected by marriage to many of the great imperial families of Europe; her sister, Elisabeth Christine, was married to Holy Roman Emperor Charles VI, ruler of the Habsburg monarchy. Though the Tsarevich expressed reluctance to enter the marriage, the pair were nevertheless wed in Torgau on October 25, 1711.

Shortly after the wedding, Alexei was dispatched to Toruń to superintend the provisioning of the Russian troops in Poland. His wife joined him in Toruń in December, but, in April 1712, he was ordered to join the army in Pomerania, and in the autumn of the same year, he was directed to accompany his father on a tour of inspection through Finland.

The marriage is considered to have been unhappy according to contemporary accounts which described Alexei as frequently intoxicated and often critical of his wife, proclaiming that she was "pockmarked" and "too thin". After a year of marriage, Alexei insisted on maintaining separate apartments and refused to acknowledge his wife in public. Some historians speculate that the disapproval of Alexei's conservative supporters of his non-Orthodox bride was ultimately the cause of estrangement between Alexei and Charlotte. Another influence on Alexei was Alexander Kikin, his political mentor and advisor, who had fallen out with the Tsar and had been deprived of his estates.

Alexei and Charlotte had two children: Natalya Alexeyevna Romanova and Peter Alexeyevich Romanov. Natalya died in Moscow at the age of 14 due to complications of tuberculosis. Their son, Peter Alexeyevich, ascended the throne as Emperor Peter II in 1727. However, in 1730, he died of smallpox, resulting in the extinction of the direct male line of the House of Romanov, whereupon it would pass through the cognatic line.

After the birth of Natalya in 1714, Alexei brought his long-time Finnish serf mistress Afrosinya to live in the palace.

== Flight ==
Immediately after his return from Finland, Alexei was again dispatched by his father to Staraya Russa and Lake Ladoga to oversee the building of new ships. This was to be the last commission entrusted to him, since Peter had not been satisfied with his son's performance. One incident involved Alexei injuring his own hand after pressure from his father to demonstrate his skills. Following this incident, Peter appears to have taken less interest in his son.

Nevertheless, Peter made one last effort to re-establish control over Alexei. On October 22, 1715 (O.S.), Charlotte died after giving birth to a son, the grand-duke Peter Alexeyevich (future emperor Peter II). On the day of the funeral, Peter sent Alexei a stern letter, urging him to again take an interest in the affairs of the state. Peter threatened to cut Alexei off if he did not acquiesce to his plans. Alexei wrote a despairing reply to his father, offering to renounce the succession in favor of his infant son Peter. To this, the Tsar said he would agree on the condition that Alexei remove himself as a dynastic threat and become a monk.

On August 26, 1716, as Alexei considered his options, Peter wrote from abroad, urging him, if he desired to remain Tsarevich, to join him and the army without delay. Rather than face his father, Alexei fled to Vienna. He arrived in Vienna on 10 November 1716. Alexei placed himself under the protection of his brother-in-law, the emperor Charles VI. For his security and care, Charles sent Alexei, accompanied throughout his journey by Afrosinya, first to the Tirolean fortress of Ehrenberg (near Reutte), and finally to the castle of Sant'Elmo in Naples. Charles may have sympathized with Alexei and suspected Peter plans for his son as suggested in Charles' confidential letter to George I of Great Britain. However, the Tsar's agents had tracked Alexei down and informed the Tsar who wrote to Charles requesting his son be returned to him. Peter considered his son’s flight as a grave insult and ordered Count Peter Tolstoi to have Alexei recovered and brought back to Russia. Count Tolstoi met with Imperial representatives and then with Alexei in Naples.

== Return and death ==
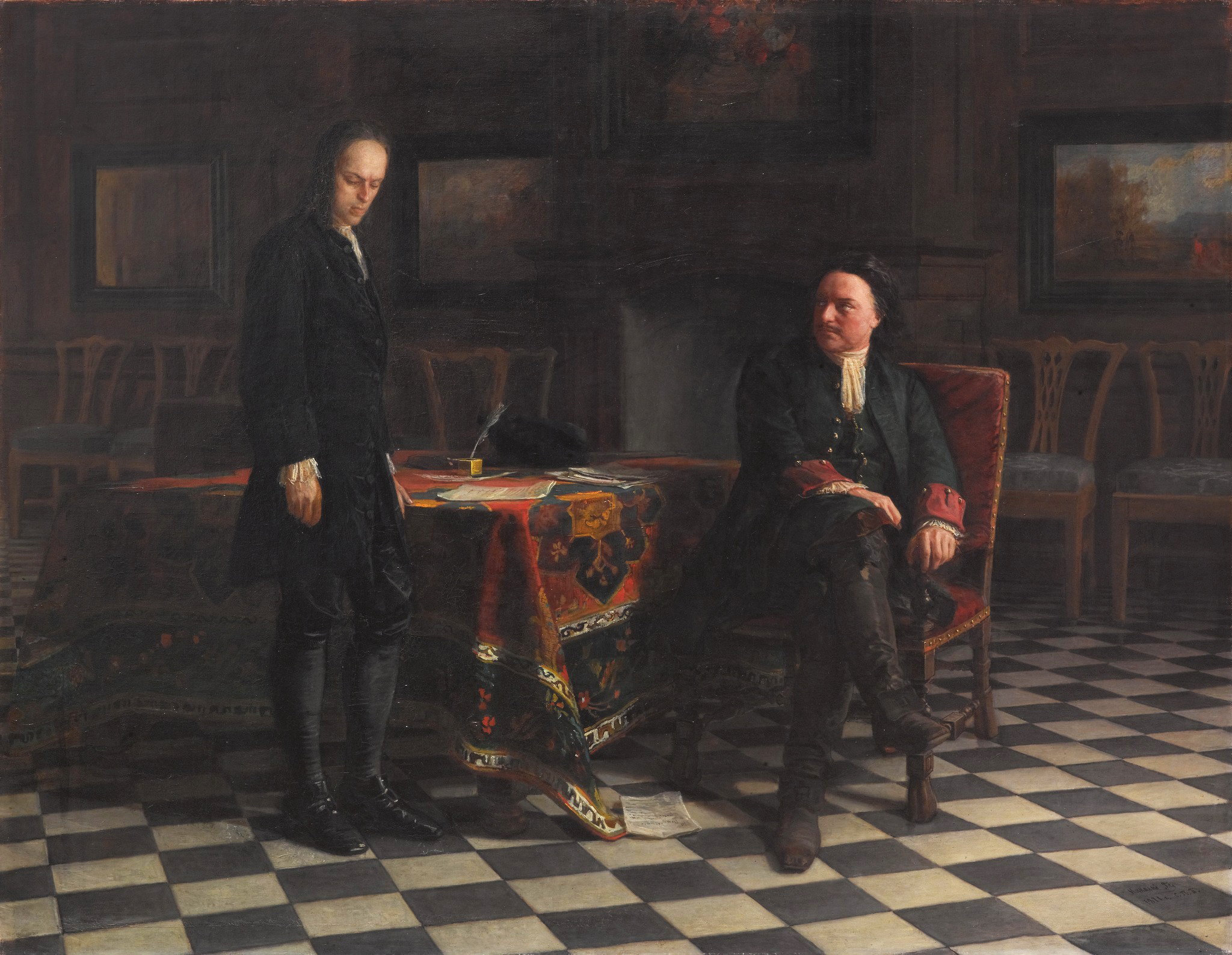
Peter the Great Interrogating the Tsarevich Alexei Petrovich at Peterhof, by Nikolai Ge, 1871, Tretyakov Gallery, Moscow

Alexei would only consent to return if his father swore that, upon return, he would not be punished, would be allowed to live quietly on his estates and to marry Afrosinya. The Tsar wrote that he would be pardoned and Alexei left for Russia with his escorts. Afrosinya remained in Venice, while Alexei reached the border of Russia on 21 January 1718. On January 31, the Tsarevich reached Moscow. At a meeting of Russian nobles in the great hall of the Kremlin, he was disinherited as Tsarevich of Russia. Alexei however was pardoned on condition he name his accomplices. However, the revealing of several damning letters and a wider circle of disaffected accomplices led Peter to determine to institute an inquisition into the reasons for Alexei's flight which was considered to be a conspiracy against the Tsar. On February 18, Alexei confessed under torture, implicated most of his acquaintances, and publicly renounced the succession to the throne in favor of his infant half-brother Peter Petrovich.

The reprisals against the Tsarevich's alleged co-conspirators were swift, unyielding, and harsh. The former Tsarina Eudoxia was dragged from her monastery and publicly tried for alleged adultery. The acquaintances of Alexei were impaled, broken on the wheel, or otherwise tortured to death. Alexei's servants were beheaded or had their tongues cut out. This not only cut off the Tsarevich from potential allies but also served to sanction the persecution of the conservative faction, which had long opposed Peter's policies.

In April 1718, fresh confessions were extorted from Alexei. This included testimony of Afrosinya, who had turned state's evidence, and reported Alexei telling her:

I shall bring back the old people and choose myself new ones according to my will; when I become sovereign, I shall live in Moscow and leave Saint Petersburg simply as any other town; I won't launch any ships; I shall maintain troops only for defense, and won't make war on anyone; I shall be content with the old domains. In winter, I shall live in Moscow, and in summer in Yaroslavl.

Despite limited evidence of existence of a conspiracy, Peter considered his son to be a confessed and dangerous traitor and submitted his case to a grand council of prelates, senators, ministers, and other dignitaries on June 13, 1718 (O.S.). The clergy, for their part, declared that Tsarevich Alexei:

"...had placed his Confidence in those who loved the ancient Customs, and that he had become acquainted with them by the Discourses they held, wherein they had constantly praised the ancient Manners, and spoke with Distaste of the Novelties his Father had introduced."

Yet as they declared this to be a civil rather than an ecclesiastical matter, the clergy left the decision to the Tsar. At noon on June 24 (O.S.), the temporal dignitaries – the 127 members of both the Senate and magistrates that comprised the court – declared Alexei guilty and sentenced him to death. Peter ordered further interrogations, possibly to uncover broader dissent or involvement.

On June 19 (O.S.), the weak and battered Tsarevich was subjected to twenty-five strokes with the knout, and then, on June 24 (O.S.), to fifteen more. On June 26 (O.S.), Alexei died in the Peter and Paul fortress in Saint Petersburg, two days after the senate had condemned him to death for conspiring to rebel against his father by provoking a popular revolt and armed intervention of his sister-in-law's husband, Emperor Charles VI.
