= Pyotr Lopukhin =

Russian politician (1753–1827)

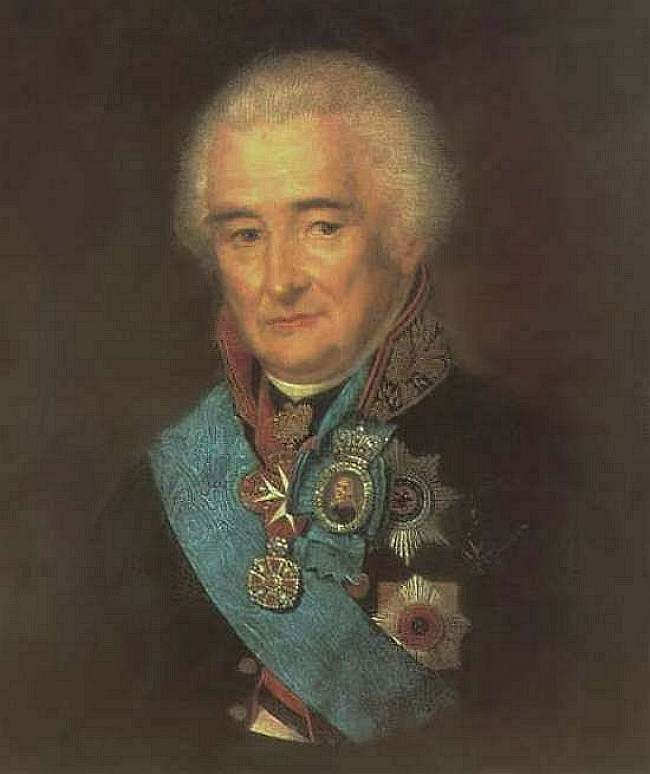
- Portrait of Lopukhin by Stepan Shchukin
- Education: Imperial Moscow University (1761)
- Military career
- Branch: Imperial Russian Army

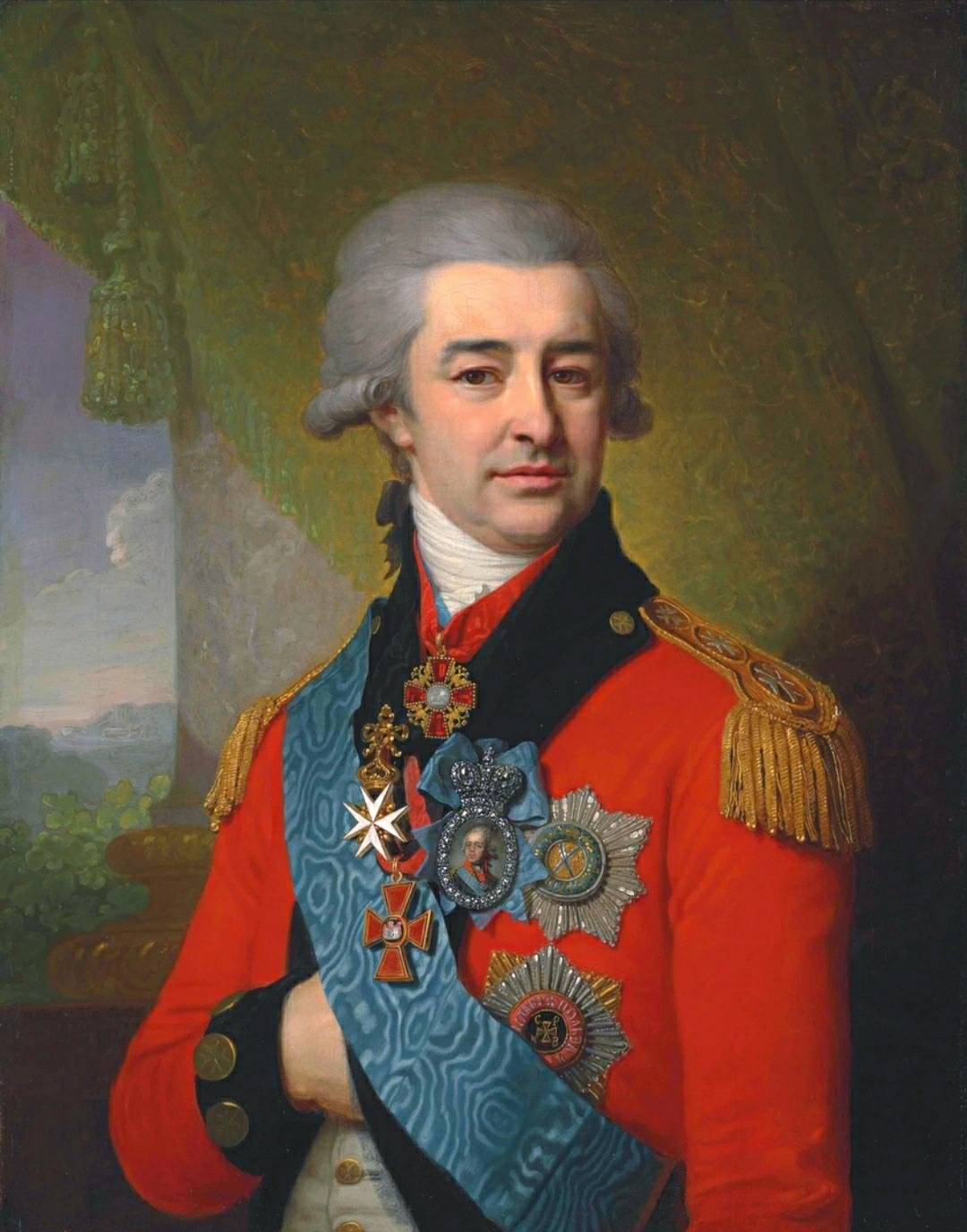
Portrait by Vladimir Borovikovsky

Prince Pyotr Vasilyevich Lopukhin (1753, Saint Petersburg – 1827) was a Russian politician and member of the Lopukhin family. He was president of the Council of Ministers from 1816 to 1827.

== Marriage and issue ==
He married twice:

- Praskovia Ivanovna, née Levshina (1760—1785). Children:
  - Princess Anna Petrovna Lopukhina (1777—1805), a royal mistress to Emperor Paul of Russia
  - Vasily Petrovich (1780—?)
  - Yekaterina Petrovna Lopukhina (Demidova) (11 April 1783 — 21 July 1830), wife of Grigory Alexandrovich Demidov
  - Praskovya Petrovna Lopukhina (Kutaisova) (1784—1870), a lady-in-waiting, wife of Pavel Kutaisov
- Ekaterina, née Shetneva (1763–1839). Children:
  - Alexandra Petrovna Lopukhina (1788—1852)
  - Pavel Petrovich Lopukhin (1790—1873), a lieutenant general, a member of the Napoleonic Wars, Freemason
  - Elizaveta Petrovna (179?—1805), died young
  - Sofya Petrovna Lopukhina (Lobanova-Rostovskay) (1798—1825), wife of Aleksey Yakovlevich Lobanov-Rostovsky, died in childbirth

== Life ==
Educated at home, he was recorded as Life Guards of the Preobrazhensky ('Transfiguration') Regiment and entered service in 1769.

Preceded by Alexis Kourakine	Procurator General of the Governing Senate; 1798–1799	Succeeded by Alexander Andreivitch Beklechov
Preceded by Gavrila Derzhavin	Procurator General of the Governing Senate (Minister of Justice of the Russian Empire); 1803–1810	Succeeded by Ivan Dmitriev
Preceded by Nikolay Saltykov	Chairman of the Russian Council of Ministers; 1816–1827	Succeeded by Viktor Kochubey
