= List of battles of the Great Northern War =

This is a list of battles of the Great Northern War (1700–1721).

By 1700, the Swedish Empire was the dominant power in Northern Europe, controlling territory from Norway to modern-day Saint Petersburg. But in this war, it was attacked from all sides by several countries: Denmark–Norway to the west, the Tsardom of Russia in the east, the Polish–Lithuanian Commonwealth to the southeast, and the Electorate of Saxony to the south. The countries formed a coalition against Sweden and surprise-attacked from all sides. By 1721, Sweden had been forced to sign a very disadvantageous peace, giving up several dominions in the Baltic and northern Germany, significantly reducing its power and effectively ending its status as an empire.

This list shows the list of the military engagements using the Gregorian calendar, Julian calendar, and Swedish calendar.

== Baltic and Finnish theatre ==
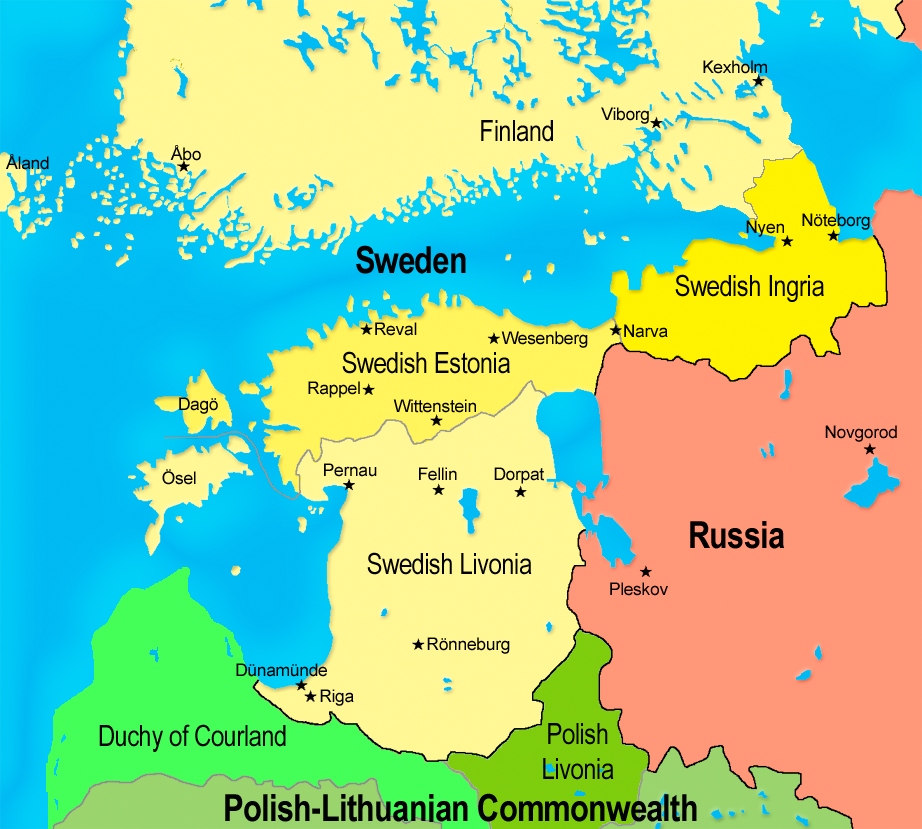
Swedish Livonia, Estonia, and Ingria

Northern War in the Swedish Baltic provinces, alias Livonian–Estonian theatre:

- Swedish Livonia
- Swedish Estonia
- Swedish Ingria
- Finland under Swedish rule

=== 1700–1707 (Narva campaign and Russian advances in Ingria) ===
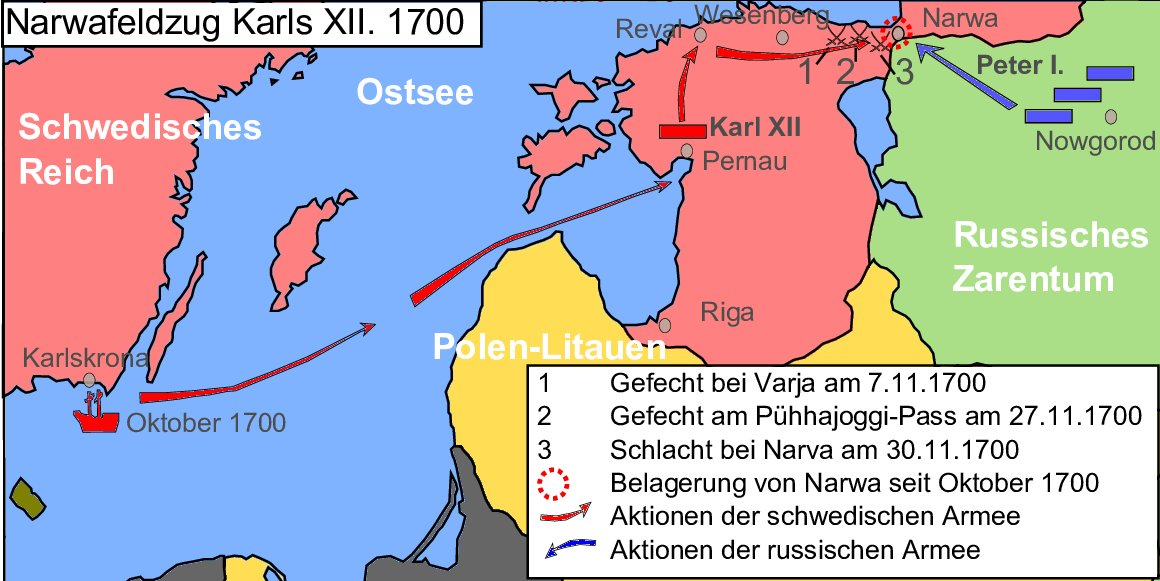
Narva campaign 1700

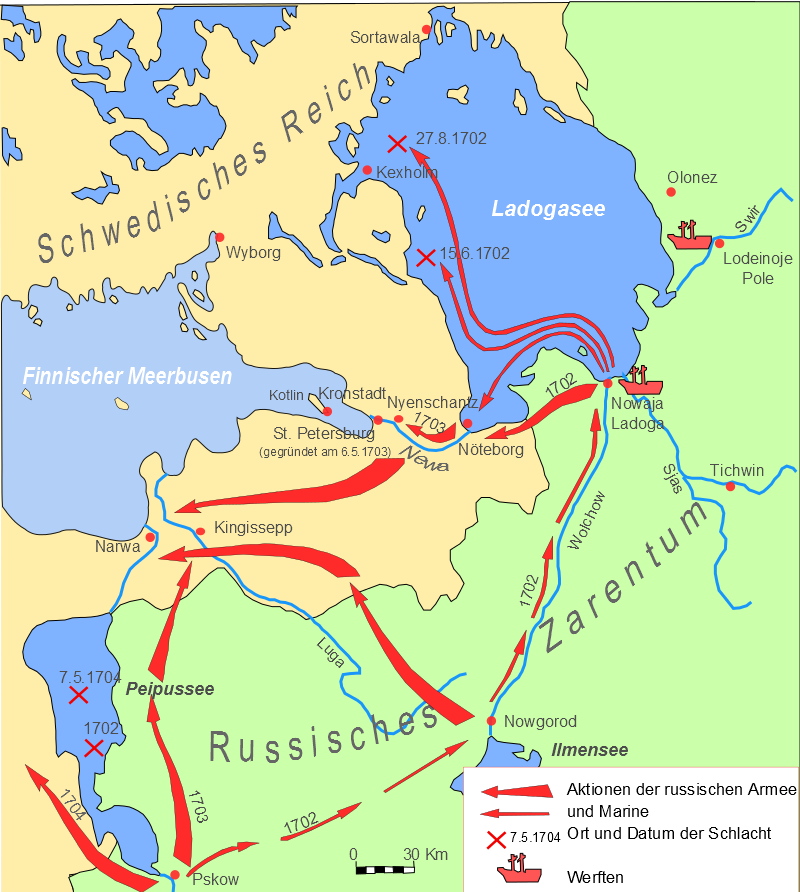
Russian advances in Ingria 1700–1704

Name	O.S. date	Swedish date	N.S. date	Front	Combatant 1	Combatant 2
Siege of Riga	11 February 1700	12 February 1700	22 February 1700	Baltic; Livonia	Sweden	Saxony
Combat of Jungfernhof	6 May 1700	7 May 1700	17 May 1700	Baltic; Livonia	Sweden	Commonwealth
Battle of Varja			7 November 1700	Baltic		
Battle of Narva (1700)			30 November 1700	Baltic; Ingria		
Battle of Rauge			15 September 1701	Baltic		
Battle of Erastfer	29 December 1701	30 December 1701	9 January 1702	Baltic		
Three actions on Lake Peipus	31 May 1702; 7 August 1703; 17 May 1704			Baltic	Sweden	Russia
Battle of Hummelshof	18 July 1702	19 July 1702	29 July 1702	Baltic		
Battle of Petschora			23 February 1701	Baltic; Ingria		
Siege of Nöteborg (1702)	26 September – 11 October 1702	27 September – 12 October 1702	7 – 22 October 1702	Baltic; Ingria		
Battle of Systerbäck				Baltic		
Siege of Nyenskans	25 April – 1 May 1703	26 April – 2 May 1703	6 May – 12 May 1703	Baltic; Ingria	Sweden	Russia
Attacks on Saint Petersburg		13 June 1704 – 16 July 1705		Baltic; Ingria	Sweden	Russia
Battle of Wesenberg (1704)				Baltic; Estonia		
Attack on Kronstadt (1704)				Baltic; Ingria		
Siege of Narva (1704)				Baltic; Ingria		
Combat of the Pühhajoggi pass			27 November 1700	Baltic; Estonia		
Battle of Räpina	4 September 1701	5 September 1701	15 September 1701	Baltic; Estonia		
Combat on the Embach	26 April 1704		7 May 1704	Baltic; Estonia		
Siege of Tartu (1704)	4 June – 13 July 1704			Baltic; Livonia		
Siege of Viborg			1706	Baltic; Ingria		
Battle of Kyyrölä	23 July 1707 (O.S.?)			Baltic; Ingria		

=== 1708–1711 (Ingrian campaign 1708; Estonia and Livonia 1709–1711) ===
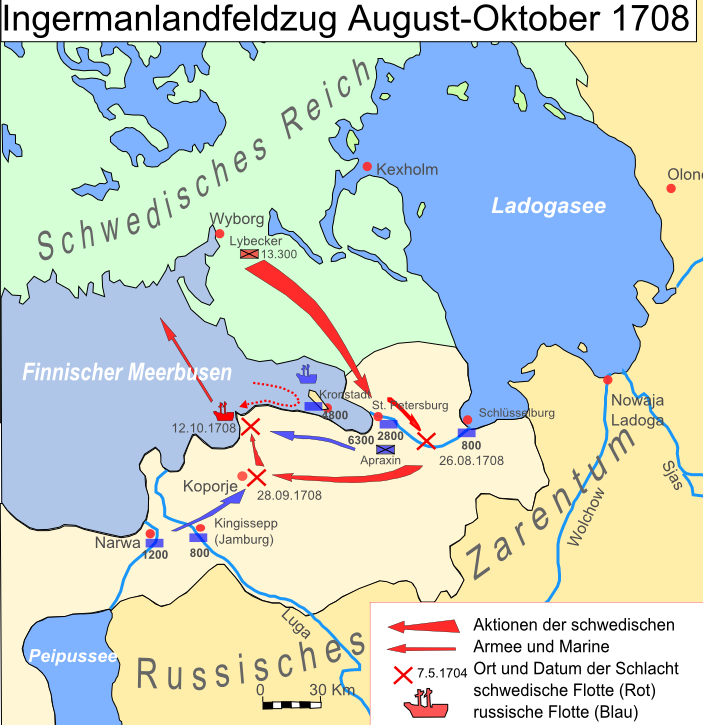
Ingrian campaign 1708

Name	O.S. date	Swedish date	N.S. date	Front	Combatant 1	Combatant 2
Sack of Porvoo		6–7 July 1708?		Baltic; Finland		
Battle of Wesenberg	5 August 1708	6 August 1708	16 August 1708	Baltic; Estonia		
Battle of the Neva	29 August 1708	30 August 1708	9 September 1708	Baltic; Ingria		
Battle of Koporye	27 September 1708	28 September 1708	8 October 1708	Baltic; Ingria		
Evacuation of Kolkanpää	16 October 1708	17 October 1708	27 October 1708	Baltic; Ingria		
Siege of Riga	27 October 1709 – 4 July 1710	28 October 1709 – 5 July 1710	6 November 1709 – 15 July 1710	Baltic; Livonia		
Siege of Pärnu	22 July – 14 August 1710	23 July – 15 August 1710	2 – 25 August 1710	Baltic; Livonia		
Siege of Tallinn	15 August – 29 September 1710?	18 August – 30 September 1710?	August – October 1710?	Baltic; Estonia		
Capitulation of Estonia and Livonia	1710	1710	1710	Baltic		
Expedition to Ösel (1711)	1711	1711	October – November 1711	Baltic; Estonia		

=== Finnish campaign (1710–1714) and Great Wrath (1714–1721) ===
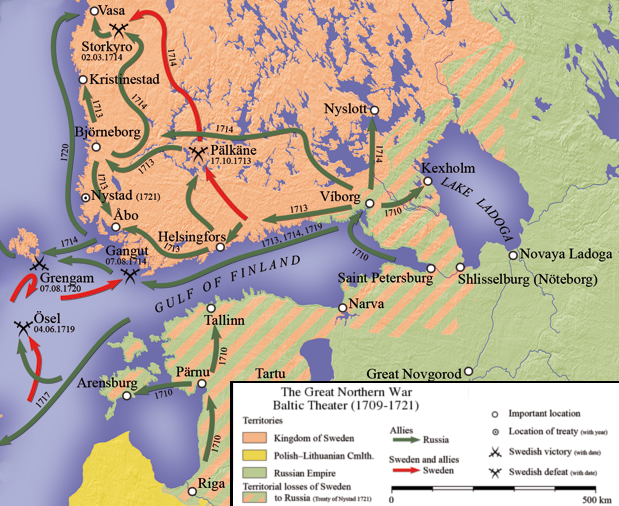
Baltic and Finnish theatre 1709–1721

Name	O.S. date	Swedish date	N.S. date	Front	Combatant 1	Combatant 2
Siege of Viborg	March 1710 – 12 June 1710	March 1710 – 13 June 1710	March 1710 – 26 June 1710	Finland	Swedish Empire	Tsardom of Russia
Siege of Kexholm		8 July – 8 September 1710?		Finland	Swedish Empire	Tsardom of Russia
Battle of Helsinki	8–11 May 1713?	–		Finland	Swedish Empire	Tsardom of Russia
Battle of Landsbro	22 August 1713?	–		Finland	Swedish Empire	Tsardom of Russia
Battle of Pälkäne	6 October 1713	–	17 October 1713	Finland	Swedish Empire	Tsardom of Russia
Battle of Napue (Isokyrö/Storkyro)		–	2 March 1714	Finland	Swedish Empire	Tsardom of Russia

- Great Wrath: Russian occupation of Finland (1714–1721)
  - Murder Friday 29 September 1714 (O.S.?)
  - Siege of Kajaneborg 1 January – 24 February 1716 (O.S.?)

== German–Danish front ==
=== Danish campaign 1700 ===
Name	O.S. date	Swedish date	N.S. date	Front	Combatant 1	Combatant 2
1st Siege of Tönning	March– August 1700	March– August 1700	March– August 1700	Holstein-Gottorp; Germany	Sweden	Denmark-Norway; Russia; Saxony
Battle of Reinbek	19 May 1700	20 May 1700	30 May 1700	Holstein-Gottorp; Germany	Sweden	Denmark–Norway
Landing at Humlebæk	24 July 1700	25 July 1700	4 August 1700	Denmark	Sweden	Denmark–Norway

- Bombardment of Copenhagen. August 1700.

=== 1711–1715 (Pomeranian theatre) ===
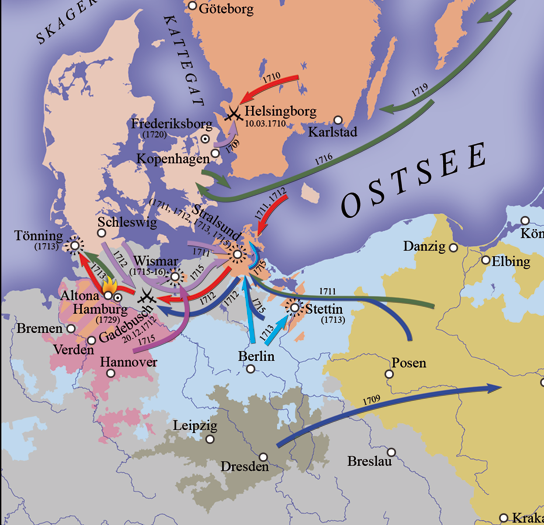
Pomeranian theatre (1711–1715)

Swedish German dominions; Mecklenburg and Holstein-Gottorp.

Name	O.S. date	Swedish date	N.S. date	Front	Combatant 1	Combatant 2
Battle of Wismar	26 November 1711	27 November 1711	5 December 1711	Stralsund; Germany	Sweden	Denmark–Norway
Siege of Stralsund	September 1711 – 13 December 1715	September 1711 – (abolished) (Note: The Swedish calendar existed from 1 March 1700 until "30 February 1712". It was one day ahead of the Julian calendar (O.S.) and 10 days behind the Gregorian calendar (N.S.), which it had been designed to gradually catch up to. However, because it mostly sowed more confusion, it was abolished on "30 February 1712", reverting to the Old-Style Julian calendar the next day on 1 March 1712 (corresponding to 11 March 1712 N.S.).)	September 1711 – 24 December 1715	Stralsund; Germany	Sweden	Denmark–Norway; Saxony; Russia (1711–14); Prussia (1714–15)

- Pomeranian campaign 1711–1712
  - Battle of Lübow 4 or 5 December 1711 (O.S./Sw.?)
  - Siege of Stade 7 August – 7 September 1712
  - Battle of Gadebusch 20 December 1712 (N.S.)
- Battle of Hollingstedt 24 January 1713
- Siege of Stettin (1713) Beginning of August – 29 September 1713
  - Prussian occupation of Stettin (1713–1720)
- 2nd Siege of Tönning 1713–February 1714
- Pomeranian campaign 1715–1716
  - Battles of Usedom 21–27 April and [Storming of Peenemünde] 31 July–22 August 1715 (O.S.?)
  - Siege of Wismar 11 June 1715 – April 1716 (O.S.?)
  - Battle of Greifswald Bay 17–25 September 1715 (N.S.?)
  - Battle of Stresow 5 November 1715 O.S. 16 November 1715 (N.S.)

== Polish–Lithuanian theatre (1700–1709) ==
=== Lithuanian Civil War (1697–1702) ===
- Battle of Valkininkai (1700) 18 November 1700 (N.S.?) Sapieha (proto-Warsaw) vs. anti-Sapieha coalition (Republicans/Confederates, proto-Sandomierz).
- Siege of Bykhaw (1702) 29 August – 10 October 1702 (O.S.?)

=== Swedish invasion of Poland (1701–1706) ===
==== July 1701 – June 1705 ====
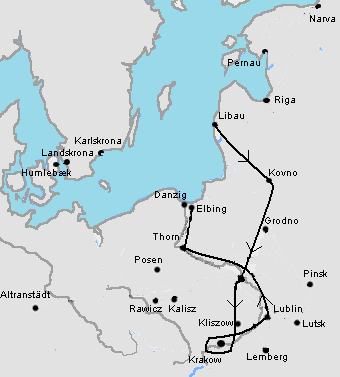
1702–1703 campaign in Poland

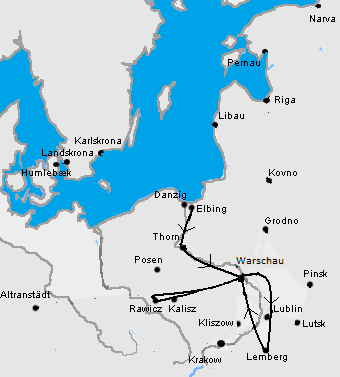
1704–1705 campaign in Poland

Name	O.S. date	Swedish date	N.S. date	Front	Combatant 1	Combatant 2
Crossing of the Düna	8 July 1701	9 July 1701	19 July 1701	Polish; Latvia		
Battle of Šiauliai	10 October 1701	11 October 1701	21 October 1701	Polish; Lithuania		
Battle of Tryškiai			15 – 16 December 1701	Polish; Lithuania		
Capture of Kaunas			20 December 1701 (N.S.?)	Polish; Lithuania		
Battle of Darsūniškis			24 March 1702	Polish; Lithuania		
Battle of Vilnius			16 April 1702	Polish; Lithuania		
Battle of Kliszów	8 July 1702	9 July 1702	19 July 1702	Polish; Poland		
Battle of Saločiai			29 March 1703	Polish; Lithuania		
Battle of Pułtusk			1 May 1703	Polish; Poland		
Siege of Thorn			26 May 1703 – 14 October 1703	Polish; Poland		
Battle of Druja (Note: Pro-Swedish Sapiehas defeat pro-Russian Ogińskis.)			20 June 1704 (N.S.?)	Polish; Belarus	Pro-Swedish Sapiehas	Pro-Russian Ogińskis
Battle of Jakobstadt			5 August 1704	Polish; Latvia		
Battle of Poznań			19 August 1704	Polish; Poland		
Storming of Lemberg (Note: Lviv.)	27 August 1704	28 August 1704	7 September 1704	Polish; Ukraine		
Battle of Poniec			7 November 1704	Polish; Poland		
Battle of Skuodas	1 November 1704	2 November 1704	12 November 1704	Polish; Lithuania		
Russian occupation of Minsk and Grodno	December 1704	December 1704	December 1704	Belarus		
Battle of Palanga	2 February 1705	3 February 1705	13 February 1705	Polish; Lithuania	Swedish Empire	Tsardom of Russia; Commonwealth

==== Campaign of Grodno (July 1705 – May 1706) ====
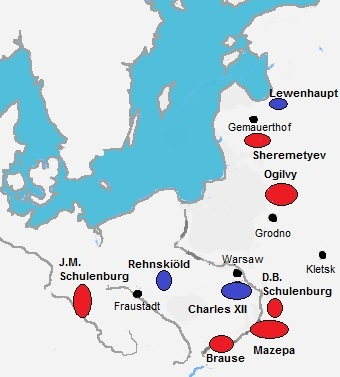
1705–1706 Campaign of Grodno

Name	O.S. date	Swedish date	N.S. date	Front	Combatant 1	Combatant 2
Battle of Gemauerthof (Note: Modern Mūrmuiža.)			26 July 1705	Grodno; Latvia		
Battle of Warsaw (Note: Also known as the Battle of Rakowitz.)			31 July 1705	Grodno; Poland		
Siege of Mitau (Note: Modern Jelgava.)	14 August – 4 September 1705		25 August – 15 September 1705	Grodno; Poland		
Battle of Praga			25 October 1705	Grodno; Poland		
Battle of Kalisz			29 October 1706	Grodno; Poland		
Battle of Grodno			26 January 1706	Grodno; Belarus		
Battle of Alytus	29 January 1706	30 January 1706	9 February 1706	Grodno; Poland		
Battle of Fraustadt (Note: Modern Wschowa.)			13 February 1706	Grodno; Poland		
Battle of Valkininkai			6 March 1706	Grodno; Lithuania		
Battle of Nyasvizh	12 March 1706	13 March 1706	23 March 1706	Grodno; Lithuania		
Siege of Lyakhavichy	mid-March – 1 May 1706	mid-March – 2 May 1706	late March 1706 – 12 May 1706	Grodno; Belarus		
Battle of Kletsk			30 April 1706	Grodno; Belarus		

=== 1707–1708 ===
- Defence of Bykhaw (1707)
- Battle of Koniecpol 21 November 1708

== Northern War in Ukraine (1700–1713) ==
=== Paliy uprising (1700–1704) ===
Map on Ukrainian Wikipedia.

Name	O.S. date	N.S. date	Front	Combatant 1	Combatant 2
Paliy uprising	1700	1704	Right-bank; Ukraine	Right-bank Hetmanate: Paliy's Cossacks; Samus' Cossacks	Polish–Lithuanian Commonwealth; Left-bank Hetmanate (1704): Mazepa's Cossacks (1704)

- Battle of Fastiv (autumn 1700)
- Unrest in Kyiv, Bratslav an Volyn voivodeships (1701)
- Unrest in Bratslav, Podolia and Volyn (early 1702)
- Revolts in Bohuslav, Korsun and Lysianka (July 1702)
- Mutiny in the Pereiaslav Regiment on the Left Bank (August 1702)
- Battle of Berdychiv (1702) (October 1702)
- Battle of Medzhybizh (late 1702)
- Siege of Bila Tserkva (7 weeks; September~November 1702)
- Podolia campaign (January–February 1703)
  - Battle of Verbka near Letychiv (4 February 1703)
- Bratslav campaign (1703)
  - Battle of Nemyriv (1703)
  - Battle of Ladyzhyn (1703)
- Mazepa's capture of Bila Tserkva (May 1704)
- Battle of Stara Syniava (July 1704)
- Capitulation of Bila Tserkva, Nemyriv, Fastiv, Korsun and Bohuslav (August 1704).
- Mazepa's Western Ukraine campaign (autumn 1705).

=== Bulavin Rebellion (1707–1708) ===
Don Cossack rebellion in Donbas and Sloboda Ukraine, with epicentre in Bakhmut.

=== Poltava campaign (1708–1709) ===
Poltava campaign map by Mykhailo Hrushevsky (1921)

Name	O.S. date	Swedish date	N.S. date	Front	Combatant 1	Combatant 2
Battle of Grodno	27 January 1708	28 January 1708	7 February 1708	Poltava; Belarus	Swedish Empire	Tsardom of Russia
Battle of Holowczyn (Note: Haloŭchyn.)	3 July 1708	4 July 1708	14 July 1708	Poltava; Belarus	Swedish Empire	Tsardom of Russia
Battle of Malatitze	30 August 1708	31 August 1708	10 September 1708	Poltava; Belarus	Swedish Empire	Tsardom of Russia
Battle of Rajovka	9 September 1708	10 September 1708	20 September 1708	Poltava; Russia (Note: The Battle of Rajovka is the only battle of the Poltava campaign that took place on the soil of the present-day Russian Federation: Rajovka (Раевка) belonged to the Smolensk Razriad, and in December 1708 was added to the Smolensk Governorate. The rest of the campaign took place in present-day Belarus (then part of the Grand Duchy of Lithuania), the Cossack Hetmanate (an independent Left-bank Ukrainian state allied with the Tsardom of Russia until Ivan Mazepa allied with Sweden in October 1708 during the Poltava campaign), a small part of Sloboda Ukraine (at the time an autonomous Cossack region of the Tsardom, mostly located in present-day Ukraine), and the Zaporizhian Sich (an independent southern Ukrainian proto-state allied with the Tsardom of Russia until Kost Hordiienko allied with Sweden in April 1709 during the Poltava campaign).)	Swedish Empire	Tsardom of Russia
Battle of Lesnaya	28 September 1708	29 September 1708	9 October 1708	Poltava; Belarus	Swedish Empire	Tsardom of Russia; Cossack Hetmanate; Kalmyk Khanate
Battle of the Desna	30 October– 2 November 1708	1– 3 November 1708	11 – 13 November 1708	Poltava; Ukraine	Swedish Empire	Tsardom of Russia
Sack of Baturyn	2 November 1708	3 November 1708	13 November 1708	Poltava; Ukraine	Cossack Hetmanate	Tsardom of Russia
Capture of Bila Tserkva	November 1708	November 1708	November 1708	Poltava; Ukraine	Cossack Hetmanate	Tsardom of Russia
Battle of Koniecpol	10 November 1708	11 November 1708	21 November 1708	Poltava; Poland	Warsaw; Confederation	Sandomierz; Confederation
Battle of Smile (Note: Сміле, Romny Raion.)	19 November 1708	20 November 1708	30 November 1708	Poltava; Ukraine	Swedish Empire	Tsardom of Russia
Sack of Romny	18 December 1708	19 December 1708	29 December 1708	Poltava; Ukraine	Cossack Hetmanate	Tsardom of Russia
Siege of Vepryk (Note: Vepryk, Poltava Oblast.)	24 December 1708 – 7 January 1709	25 December 1708 – 8 January 1709	3 – 18 January 1709	Poltava; Ukraine	Swedish Empire; Cossack Hetmanate	Tsardom of Russia; Cossacks
Battle of Opishnia	28 January 1709	29 January 1709	8 February 1709	Poltava; Ukraine	Swedish Empire	Tsardom of Russia
Battle of Khukhra	8 February 1709	9 February 1709	19 February 1709	Poltava; Ukraine	Swedish Empire	Tsardom of Russia
Battle of Krasnokutsk –Gorodnoye	10 February 1709	11 February 1709	21 February 1709	Poltava; Ukraine	Swedish Empire	Tsardom of Russia
Siege of Poltava	7 April – 27 June 1709	8 April – 28 June 1709	18 April – 8 July 1709	Poltava; Ukraine	Swedish Empire; Cossack Hetmanate; Zaporizhian Sich	Tsardom of Russia
Battle of Sokilka	12 April 1709	13 April 1709	23 April 1709	Poltava; Ukraine	Swedish Empire; Cossack Hetmanate; Zaporizhian Sich	Tsardom of Russia; Cossack Hetmanate
Battle of Stary; Sanzhary	14 June 1709	15 June 1709	25 June 1709	Poltava; Ukraine	Swedish Empire	Tsardom of Russia
Battle of Poltava	27 June 1709	28 June 1709	8 July 1709	Poltava; Ukraine	Swedish Empire; Cossack Hetmanate	Tsardom of Russia; Cossack Hetmanate
Surrender at Perevolochna	30 June 1709	1 July 1709	11 July 1709	Poltava; Ukraine	Swedish Empire	Tsardom of Russia

- See also Executions of Cossacks in Lebedyn (November 1708 – early 1709).

=== Chortomlyk expedition of 1709 ===
Chortomlyk expedition of 1709

- Chortomlyk expedition of 1709 (April – 25 May 1709)

Name	O.S. date	Swedish date	N.S. date	Front	Combatant 1	Combatant 2
Battle of Tsarychanka	26 March 1709	27 March 1709	6 April 1709	Chortomlyk; Ukraine	Zaporizhian Sich	Tsardom of Russia
Sack of Keleberda	16 April 1709	17 April 1709	27 April 1709	Chortomlyk; Ukraine	Zaporizhian Sich	Tsardom of Russia
Sack of Perevolochna	18 April 1709	19 April 1709	29 April 1709	Chortomlyk; Ukraine	Zaporizhian Sich	Tsardom of Russia
Sack of New Kodak and Old Kodak	30 April 1709	1 May 1709	11 May 1709	Chortomlyk; Ukraine	Zaporizhian Sich	Tsardom of Russia
Destruction of the Chortomlyk Sich	14 May 1709	15 May 1709	25 May 1709	Chortomlyk; Ukraine	Zaporizhian Sich	Tsardom of Russia

=== Sapieha's Volhynian campaign (April–May 1709) ===
Name	O.S. date	Swedish date	N.S. date	Front	Combatant 1	Combatant 2
Battle of Liakhivtsi (Note: Modern Bilohiria.)	1 April 1709	2 April 1709	12 April 1709	Volhynia; Ukraine	Warsaw Confederation	Tsardom of Russia
Battle of Lidykhiv (Battle of Nakvasha)	13 May 1709	14 May 1709	24 May 1709	Volhynia; Ukraine	Warsaw Confederation	Tsardom of Russia

=== 1711 ===
- Crimean raid on Sloboda Ukraine (January–March 1711)
- Pylyp Orlyk's March on Right-bank Ukraine 11 February – 27 March 1711 O.S. 22 February – 7 April 1711 N.S.
- Crimean campaign (1711) 30 May – 24 July 1711

== Russia proper (1704–1711) ==
- Attack on Archangelsk 7 June to 25 August 1701 (Sw.), 25 June O.S., 6 July N.S.

=== Bashkir rebellion of 1704–1711 ===
- Bashkir rebellion of 1704–1711 (Note: The Bashkir rebellion of 1704–1711 was caused by the introduction of 72 new taxes (including on mosques, mullahs and mosque attendees) by Tsarist Russia on the non-Russian peoples (Bashkirs, Kazakhs, Tatars, Nogais, and Karakalpaks) between the Volga and the Urals and in Northwestern Central Asia. The taxes plus demands for 20,000 horses and 4,000 soldiers were levied in order to finance the tsar's expenses for the Great Northern War in Europe. Although the rebels never directly allied themselves with the Swedish coalition, they functioned as co-belligerents against Russia. In the end, the rebellion was crushed, but at a huge cost to the tsar's regime.)
  - Battle of Yuraktau (1707) 16 November 1707
  - Kazan campaign end of December 1707 – end of February 1708
    - Battle of Kazan (1708) 22 February 1708

=== Bulavin Rebellion ===
See #Bulavin Rebellion (1707–1708).

== Swedish invasion of Saxony (6–24 September 1706) ==
- Combat of Rosenhain 7 September 1706
- Combat of Frauenwald 22 September 1706

== Sweden proper (1709–1721) ==
Map of the Swedish Empire 1658–1815.

Name	O.S. date	Swedish date	N.S. date	Front	Combatant 1	Combatant 2
Scania and Blekinge campaign	1 November 1709 – 4 March 1710	2 November 1709 – 5 March 1710	12 November 1709 – 15 March 1710	Sweden	Swedish Empire	Denmark–Norway
Battle of Helsingborg	27 February 1710	28 February 1710	10 March 1710	Sweden	Swedish Empire	Denmark–Norway
Battle of Gothenburg	2–3 May 1717	–	13–14 May 1717	Sweden	Swedish Empire	Denmark–Norway
Battles at Göta Älv	2 May 1717 – 27 September 1719	–	13 May 1717 – 8 October 1719	Sweden	Swedish Empire	Denmark–Norway
Battle of Strömstad	8 July 1717	–	19 July 1717	Sweden	Swedish Empire	Denmark–Norway
Attack on Marstrand	10–16 July 1719	–	21–27 July 1719	Sweden	Swedish Empire	Denmark–Norway
Battle of Stäket	13 August 1719	–	24 August 1719	Sweden	Swedish Empire	Tsardom of Russia

- Russian Pillage of 1719–1721
  - Sacking of Umeå (1720) and Hudiksvall, Sundsvall, Söderhamn, Härnösand and Piteå (1721).

== Russo-Turkish War (1710–1713) ==
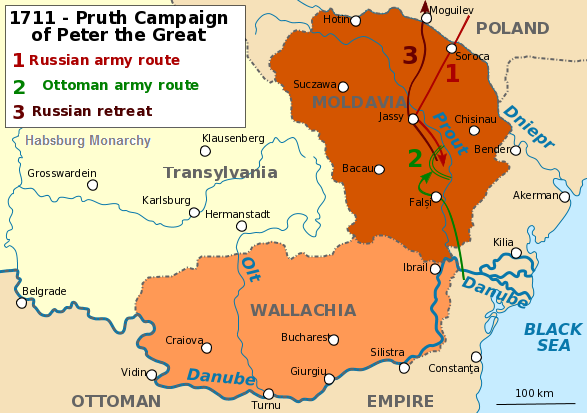
Pruth River Campaign (June–July 1711)

- Pylyp Orlyk's March on Right-bank Ukraine 11 February – 27 March 1711
  - Battle of Lysianka (1711) February-March 1711
  - Siege of Bila Tserkva (1711) 25–27 March 1711 (O.S.)
- Pruth River Campaign (June–July 1711)
  - Siege of Brăila (1711) 7 – 14 July 1711
  - Battle of Stănilești 9–11 July 1711
- Crimean campaign (1711) 30 May – 24 July 1711 (O.S.)
- Kuban Campaign (1711) 3 July – 6 September 1711 (O.S.)

Aftermath

- Skirmish at Bender 1 February 1713 O.S.; 12 February 1713 N.S.

== Norwegian theatre (1716–1719) ==
Armfeldt's campaign to Trondheim (top) and the Carolean Death March (bottom) from August 1718 to January 1719.

Name	O.S. date	N.S. date	Front	Combatant 1	Combatant 2
Norwegian campaign of 1716	26 February – 28 June 1716	8 March – 8 July 1716	Norway	Swedish Empire	Denmark–Norway
Battle of Høland	9 March 1716?	9 March 1716?	Norway	Swedish Empire	Denmark–Norway
Occupation of Christiania	11 March – 19 April 1716	22 March – 30 April 1716	Norway	Swedish Empire	Denmark–Norway
Capture of Sponvika Redoubt	23–26 May 1716?	23–26 May 1716?	Norway	Swedish Empire	Denmark–Norway
Battle of Dynekilen	28 June 1716	8 July 1716	Norway	Swedish Empire	Denmark–Norway
Siege of Fredriksten	30 November 1718	11 December 1718	Norway	Swedish Empire	Denmark–Norway
Armfeldt's campaign to Trondheim	18 August 1718 – 27 December 1718	29 August 1718 – 7 January 1719	Norway	Swedish Empire	Denmark–Norway
Carolean Death March	28 December 1718 – 5 January 1719	8 December 1718 – 16 January 1719	Norway	Swedish Empire	Denmark–Norway

== Naval battles ==
Name	O.S. date	Swedish date	N.S. date	Front	Combatant 1	Combatant 2
Battle of Køge Bay (1710)	23 September 1710	24 September 1710	4 October 1710	Naval	Swedish Empire	Denmark–Norway
Battle of Fladstrand	30 April 1712	(abolished)	11 May 1712	Naval	Swedish Empire	Denmark–Norway
Battle of Hogland (1713)	10–11 July 1713	–	21–22 July 1713	Naval	Swedish Empire	Russia
Battle of Gangut	27 July 1714	–	7 August 1714	Naval	Swedish Empire	Russia
Battle of Fehmarn (1715)	13 April 1715	–	24 April 1715	Naval	Swedish Empire	Denmark–Norway
Battle of Rügen (1715)	28 July 1715	–	8 August 1715	Naval	Swedish Empire	Denmark–Norway
Battle of Ösel Island	24 May 1719	–	4 June 1719	Naval	Swedish Empire	Russia
Battle of Grengam	27 July 1720	–	7 August 1720	Naval	Swedish Empire	Russia

== See also ==
- Great Northern War plague outbreak (1702–1714; peak 1708–1712)
- Swedish invasion of Russia#Battles – troop statistics
- List of battles involving the Zaporizhian Cossacks (1489–1775)
- List of battles of the Khmelnytsky Uprising (1648–1657)
- List of battles of the Polish–Russian War (1654–1667)

== Bibliography ==
- Henriksson, Håkan (December 2009). "När kosackerna kom till Askersund" [When the Cossacks came to Askersund] (PDF). Aktstycket (in Swedish): 6–12.
- Svensson, Axel (2001). Karl XII som fältherre [Charles XII as Field Commander] (in Swedish). Stockholm: Svenskt Militärhistoriskt Bibliotek. p. 158. ISBN 91-974056-1-2.
- Tairova-Yakovleva, Tatiana (2020). Ivan Mazepa and the Russian Empire (PDF). Montreal Kingston London Chicago: McGill-Queen's Press. p. 425. ISBN 978-0-2280-0309-0.

== External link ==
- Neutronex (22 February 2021). "Great Northern War (1700 - 1732) : Every other day". YouTube.
