= Battle of Hollingstedt =

Battle of the Great Northern War

- Part of the Great Northern War
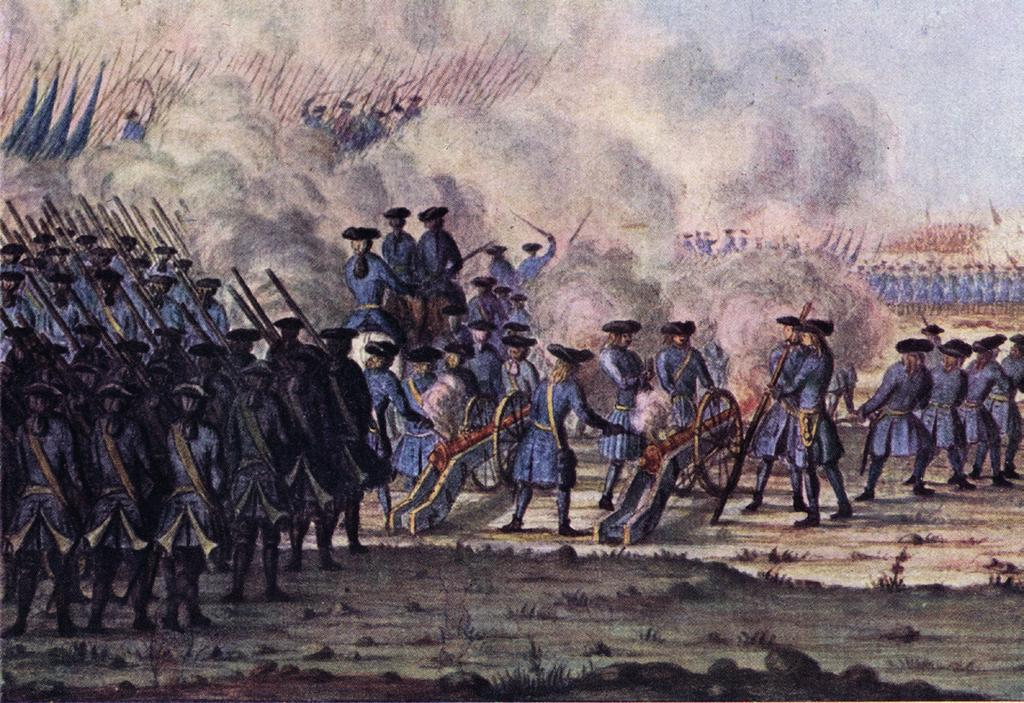
- Swedish troops at Gadebusch the previous month, by Magnus Rommel
Date	24 January 1713
Location	Hollingstedt, at the Treene, in Holstein-Gottorp (present-day Germany)
Result	See Aftermath

Belligerents
(yes) Swedish Empire	Tsardom of Russia

Commanders and leaders
Diedrik Johan von Löwenstern; Christer Reinhold von Schlippenbach	Rudolph Felix Bauer

Strength
500–1,000 men 4 cannons	4,000; 8 cannons

Casualties and losses
33	300

The Battle of Hollingstedt was fought on 24 January 1713 between Sweden and Russia, in the German theatre of the Great Northern War. Whilst in Ottoman exile, Charles XII of Sweden commanded Magnus Stenbock to lead an army from Swedish Pomerania east, against Russia. Circumstances forced Stenbock to march west into neutral Holstein-Gottorp, pursued by a large coalition army. The Swedes took position west of the Treene river, only sparing the bridge at Hollingstedt (east of the river) where an outpost was established.

A Russian force under Rudolph Felix Bauer was sent to dislodge them. The Swedes, under Diedrik Johan von Löwenstern and Christer Reinhold von Schlippenbach, quit the village after some fighting to defend the bridge. Several Russian attacks were repulsed until Bauer forded the frozen river elsewhere. The Swedes counter-attacked his bridgehead, forcing him back over the river. Consequently, Stenbock believed a general battle was imminent; he deployed his troops in exposed weather for three days before withdrawing closer to Tönning, which the Gottorpers permitted him to use. He was eventually pushed inside the fortress by the coalition and besieged until his surrender in May 1713.

== Background ==
After the Swedish defeat at Poltava in 1709, Denmark–Norway and Saxony reentered the Great Northern War on Russia's side. From his exile in the Ottoman Empire, king Charles XII planned to use Swedish Pomerania as a staging point for new offensives into the Polish–Lithuanian Commonwealth and Russia in conjunction with the Ottomans. Accordingly, a larger Swedish army under Magnus Stenbock was shipped over from Sweden proper to the Rügen island at Stralsund in September 1712. The city had been blockaded by the coalition for a year, following an invasion of the Swedish German dominions. However, Stenbock's supply transport was badly mauled by the Danes off Wittow, making his position near Stralsund unsustainable and a march into Poland infeasible.

=== Stenbock's campaign ===
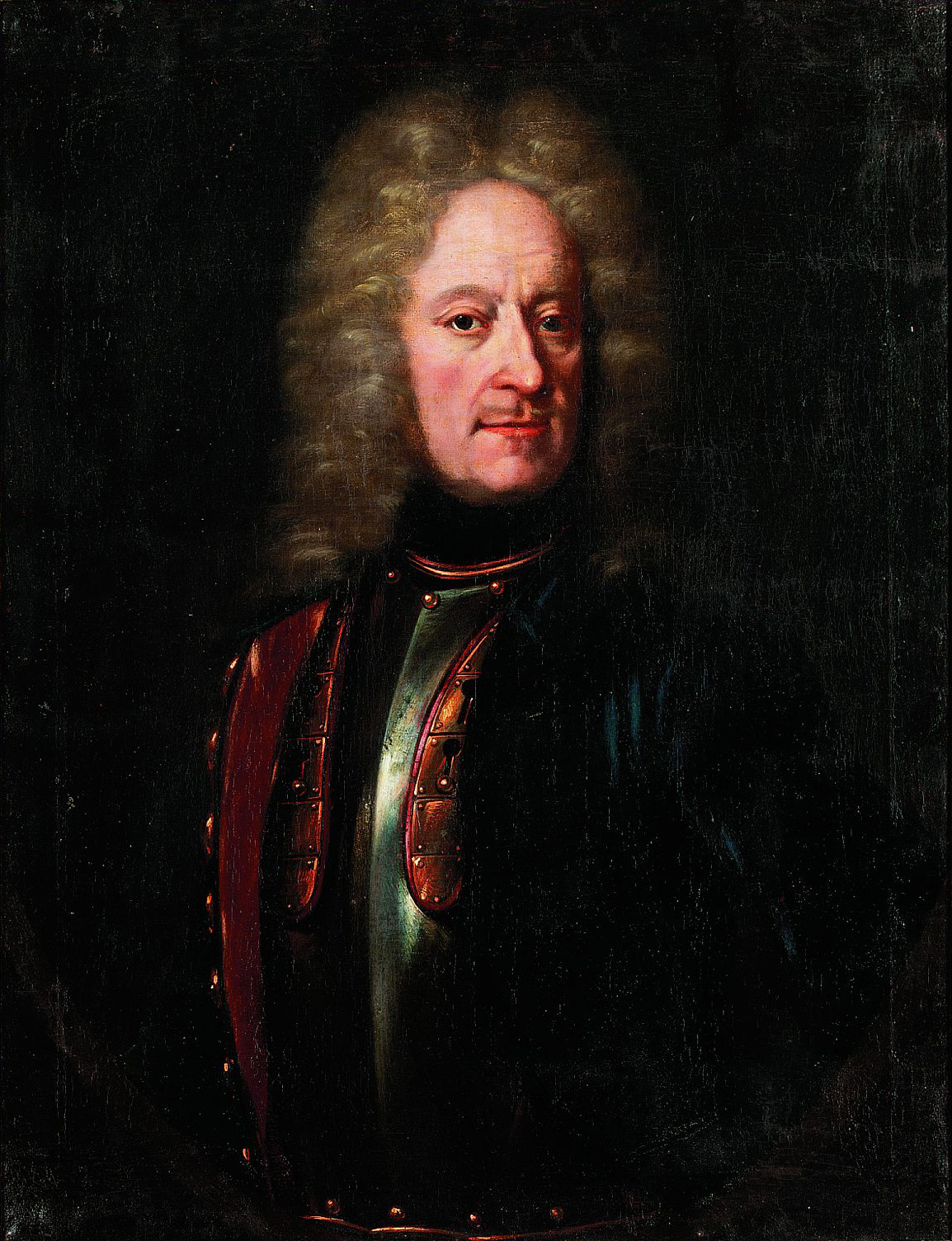
Magnus Stenbock, by Johann Heinrich Wedekind

In early November, Stenbock penetrated the coalition pocket at Damgarten with 16,000 men and marched west into neutral Mecklenburg-Schwerin to feed the army. He hoped to receive a second transport of supplies and troops either at the port town of Rostock, which was quickly captured, or Wismar. 22,000 Saxons and Russians shadowed Stenbock from Pomerania, with the intention of uniting forces with a Danish army of some 16,000 men further west of him. The Danes broke into Mecklenburg in December, but Stenbock defeated them at Gadebusch before an enemy conjunction was made possible. His army was too weak to follow up the victory and remained near Wismar, before marching further west into Schleswig-Holstein on 30 December.

Stenbock, deprived of another transport due to disease and unfavourable winds, departed the coast on 3 January and went into Danish-Holstein to live off the land. He marched through Segeberg–Pinneberg–Itzehoe, burning Altona along the way, into neutral Holstein-Gottorp near Heide and crossed the Eider river at Friedrichstadt on 17 January. Stenbock stopped at Husum since the army was deemed too weak to continue into Jutland; his north side was protected by the Arlau river, the south and east by the Treene (a tributary to the Eider) and the west by the Eiderstedt peninsula and Tönning – the Gottorpers permitted him to use the fortress as a last resort. (Note: Holstein-Gottorp, a traditional Swedish ally, was formally neutral in the war as Stenbock requested access to Tönning. The Gottorpers officially declined his request as to not violate their neutrality, while two privy councillors willingly conducted secret negotiations with him to that effect; Stenbock was publicly portrayed as having taken Tönning using military deception.) Stenbock envisaged that a shortage of supplies, renewed Ottoman offensives, or the interference of foreign powers would eventually force the pursuing coalition away. All bridges were destroyed but one going over the Treene at Hollingstedt, where a few squadrons under colonel Diedrik Johan von Löwenstern formed an outpost.

== Battle ==
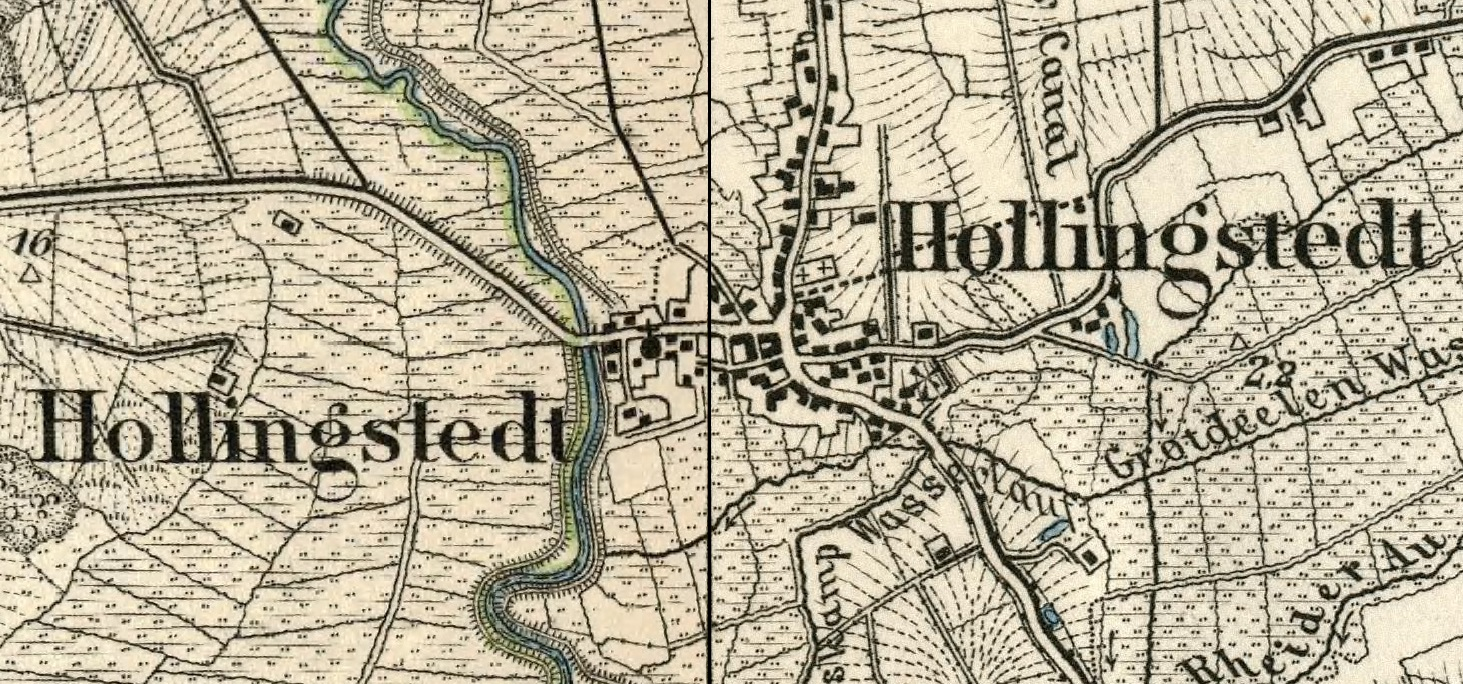
Hollingstedt in 1887

Löwenstern's patrols informed Stenbock that coalition forces were crossing the Eider from the south, threatening to also cross the Treene at Hollingstedt. Stenbock sent 500 infantry from the Södermanland Regiment under colonel Reinhold von Schlippenbach and four cannons to reinforce Löwenstern. (Note: According to Nordberg, the combined force at Hollingstedt consisted of 2,000 men and six cannons. Löwenstern's cavalry included squadrons from either or both the Pomeranian Cavalry Regiment and the Verden Dragoon Regiment, whom were tasked with observing the Treene.) He arrived on 23 January and, at Löwenstern's request, deployed 200 infantry at the graveyard in Hollingstedt, situated east of the river. At dawn the next day, alarm went out of an approaching Russian force; Löwenstern assembled his cavalry at the clergy house in front of Schlippenbach, who led the graveyard's defence supported by his cannons from the western bank.

Tsar Peter I sent Rudolph Felix Bauer with 4,000 (Note: Loenbom puts the Russian force at between 5,000 and 6,000 men.) infantry and dragoons to dislodge the Swedes from the bridge, supported by eight cannons. He arrived at eight o'clock the next morning and forced Löwenstern to give way after some fighting. The pursuit of the Swedish cavalry stopped at the graveyard, where Schlippenbach put up a stiff resistance. Russian attempts to cut him off from the bridge were prevented as Schlippenbach conducted a fighting retreat, covered by a 50-man strong rearguard. The combat resumed at the bridge for half an hour, resulting in several attacks being repulsed. Thousands of Russians eventually managed to ford the frozen river and occupy a dam on Schlippenbach's left flank, forcing him to quit the bridge.

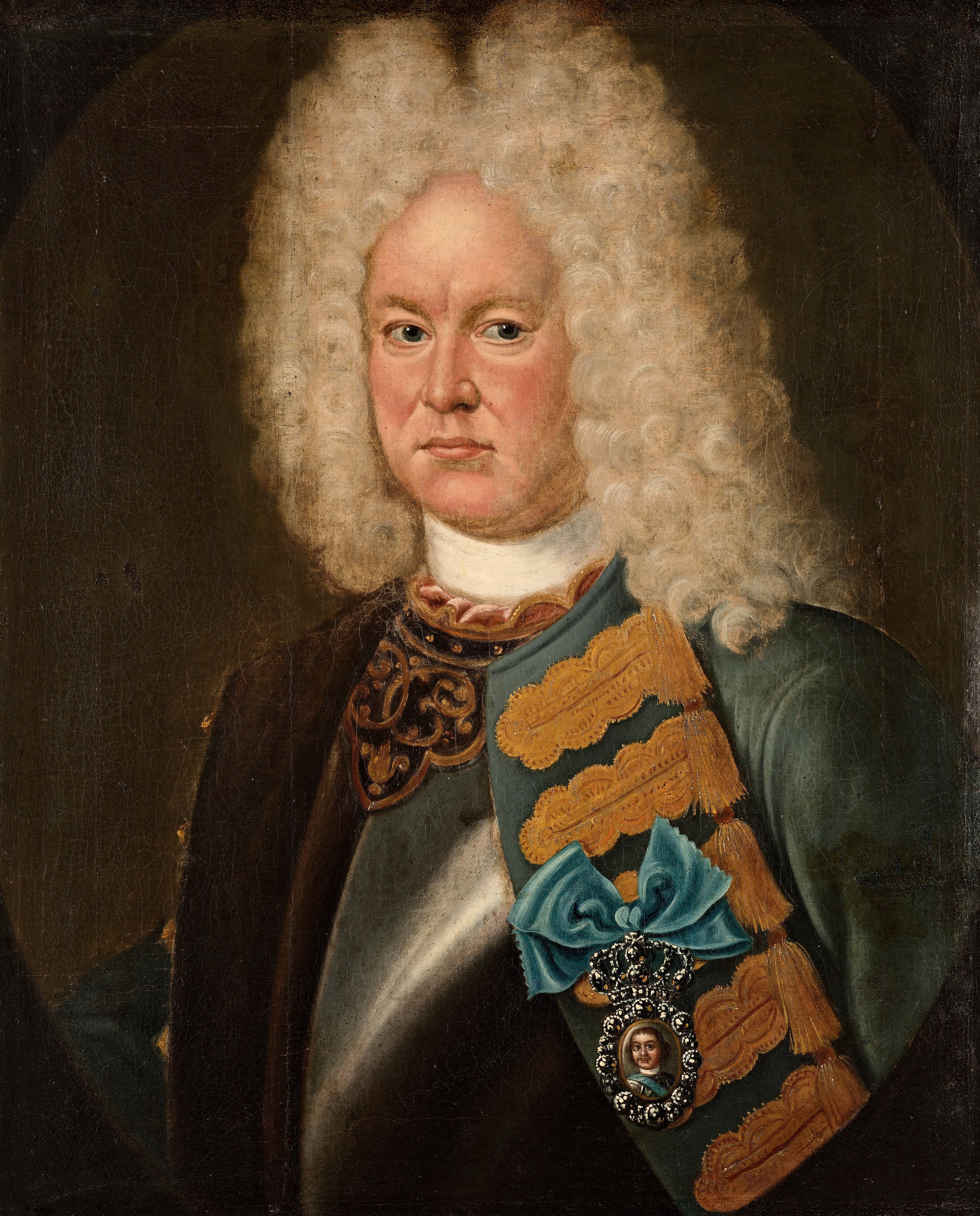
Rudolph Felix Bauer

Löwenstern and Schlippenbach, now reinforced with the other 300 infantry, counter-attacked to prevent Bauer from securing a bridgehead. The artillery was used to great effect against the dam, which he utilised as a breastwork. After an hour of fighting, in which the Swedish Cronstedt cannons (Note: Stenbock's cannons had been vastly upgraded by lieutenant colonel Carl Cronstedt for the campaign. His measures led to improved accuracy, impact force, mobility, grouping speed and fire rate; the Cronstedt cannons were capable of firing at least 10 shots a minute to the previous one or two.) silenced their Russian counterparts, Bauer withdrew over the river to Hollingstedt. The Swedes partially destroyed the bridge in the night, and severed it completely several days later to prevent it from falling into enemy hands. The Russian losses were probably considerable, (Note: Nordberg estimates that the Russians lost up to 1,000 men.) with some sources putting them at 300 men. The Swedes allegedly witnessed them transporting four wagons with dead, apart from a captain and several others who were buried at Hollingstedt. The Swedes had one captain, one lieutenant and 10 privates killed, and one second lieutenant and 20 privates wounded.

== Aftermath ==
It is disputed among the sources which side won the battle; in their respective works about the Tsar, Daniel Defoe indicates that the Swedes were successful, while Alexander Gordon suggests the opposite. The Russians captured Hollingstedt, which prevented the Swedes from using the village for reconnaissance, but failed to take the bridge.

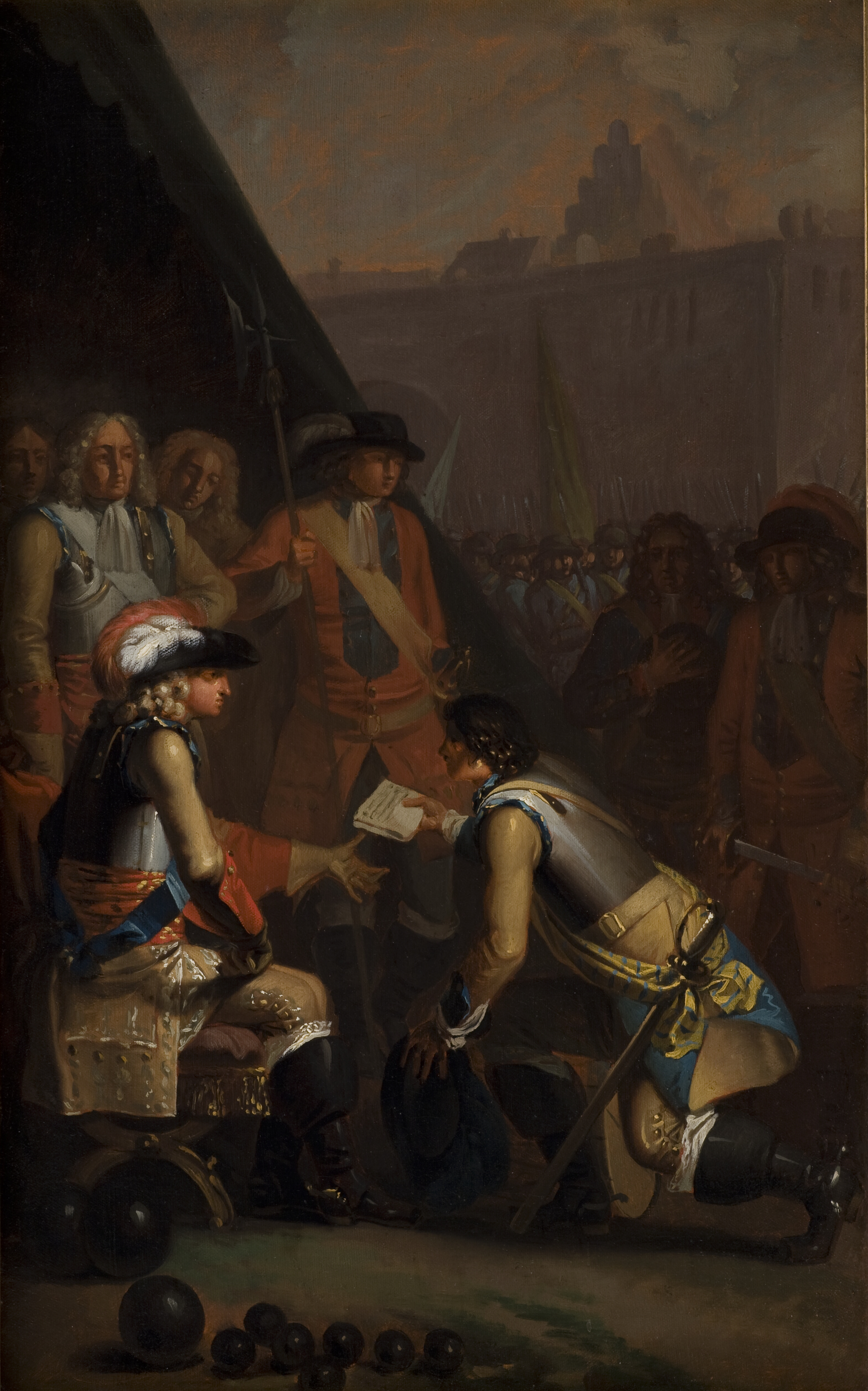
Stenbock's capitulation, by Nicolai Abildgaard

As a result, Stenbock, who mistakenly believed that the coalition sought a general battle, formed up his army near Mildstedt; the troops endured in exposed weather for three days, until they were withdrawn into Eiderstedt on 26 January. It became increasingly apparent to Stenbock that a Swedish rescue fleet was of the essence. After having united forces, the coalition army counted 38,000 (Note: Excluding officers, non-combatants, sick and irregulars, such as Cossacks, Kalmyks or certain Polish cavalry.) privates and non-commissioned officers. The Swedish forward positions were assaulted on 12 February and pushed further back towards Tönning and its garrison of some 1,750 Gottorpers.

On 19 February, a Swedish breakout attempt over the Eider failed; as did a sortie against Friedrichstadt three days later. Desertions, disease and famine further escalated in April, as the Swedes were being enclosed also from the sea. Rather than facing a major coalition offensive over Eiderstedt on 27 April, Stenbock withdrew all his troops into Tönning. On 16 May, he capitulated and became a prisoner of war along with 10,500 privates, NCOs and officers, of whom almost 3,000 were sick. The bulk of the coalition forces returned to Swedish Pomerania, eventually capturing Stettin (Szczecin) and Stralsund in 1713 and 1715, respectively. The Gottorpers in Tönning held out until February 1714, when they finally surrendered to the besieging Danish army.

== Sources ==
=== Bibliography ===
- Annerstedt, Claes (1906). Svenska akademiens handlingar ifrån år 1886: Minne af fältmarskalken grefve Magnus Stenbock [Proceedings of the Swedish Academy from 1886: Memory of Field Marshal Count Magnus Stenbock] (in Swedish). Vol. 20. Stockholm: Norstedt. OCLC 924849834.
- Defoe, Daniel (1723). An Impartial History of the Life and Actions of Peter Alexowitz, the Present Czar of Muscovy. London: W. Chetwood. OCLC 187300321.
- Gordon, Alexander (1755). The History of Peter the Great, Emperor of Russia. Vol. 2. Aberdeen: F. Douglass and W. Murray. OCLC 181834574.
- Kling, Steve (2015). "Magnus Stenbock and the descent on Northern Germany". Great Northern War Compendium. Vol. 2. St. Louis: THGC Publishing. ISBN 978-0-9964557-3-2.
- Loenbom, Samuel (1790). Den kongelige Svenske Rigsraad og Feldtmarskalk Greve Magnus Stenbocks Levnets-Historie [The Royal Swedish Privy Council and Fieldmarshal, Count Magnus Stenbock's Life-History] (in Danish). Vol. 2. Copenhagen: Boghandler Mallings Forlag. OCLC 1227927385.
- Munthe, Arnold (1927). Karl XII och den ryska sjömakten – Bilaga: Magnus Stenbocks förtvivlade kamp mot Sveriges tre fiender 1712–1713 [Charles XII and the Russian naval forces – Appendix: Magnus Stenbock's desperate struggle against Sweden's three enemies 1712–1713] (in Swedish). Vol. 3. Stockholm: Hæggströms boktryckeri och bokförlags AB. OCLC 836609668.
- Nordberg, Jöran (1740). Konung Carl den XII:tes historia: Ifrån slutet af junii månad år 1709, til hans may:ts död och begrafning [Charles XII:s history: From the end of June 1709 to his Royal Majesty's death and burial] (in Swedish). Vol. 2. Stockholm: Pet. Momma. OCLC 929239840.
- Tuxen, August; With-Seidelin, Carl (1910). Bidrag til den store nordiske Krigs Historie: De nordiske allieredes Kamp med Magnus Stenbock 1712–1713 [Contribution to the history of the Great Northern War: The northern allies' struggle against Magnus Stenbock 1712–1713] (in Danish). Vol. 4. Copenhagen: Gyldendalske Boghandel, Nordisk Forlag. OCLC 929129626.
- Ulfhielm, Hans (1999). Svenska artilleristprofiler under fyra sekel [Swedish artillery profiles during four centuries] (in Swedish). Stockholm: Militärhistoriska förlaget. ISBN 9185266736.
