= Battles of Usedom =

1715 invasions of the Great Northern War

- Part of the Great Northern War
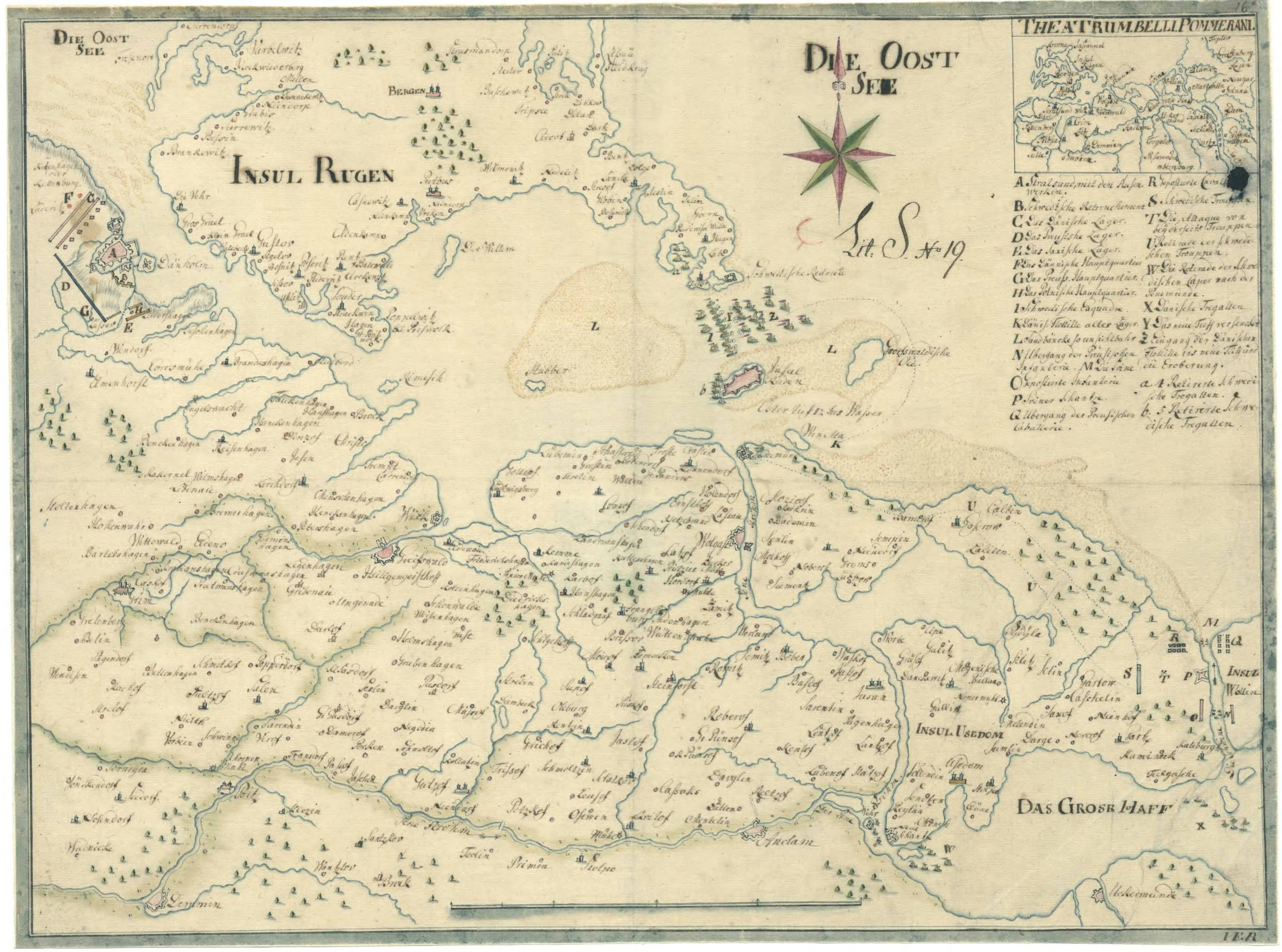
- Fighting in Swedish Pomerania 1715, with the allied invasion of Usedom depicted (lower-right)
Date	21–27 April / 31 July–22 August 1715
Location	Usedom, Swedish Pomerania (Germany)
Result	21–27 April: Swedish victory 31 July–22 August: Allied victory

Belligerents
(yes) Swedish Empire	Kingdom of Prussia; Electorate of Saxony; Denmark–Norway

Commanders and leaders
(yes) Charles XII (yes) Christian Grothusen (yes) Johan Kuse (yes) Unbehaven	Georg von Arnim; Von Jeetze; Frederick Louis; Boysen

Strength
April: 3,000 men; 10+ ships July–August: 600–800 men; 7+ ships	April: 300+ men July–August: 4,200 men; 15+ ships

Casualties and losses
April: Minor July–August: 500–600	April: Minor July–August: 700

The Battles of Usedom were fought on 21–27 April and 31 July–22 August 1715, between Swedish and Prussian, Saxon and Danish forces. In 1711, the Great Northern War spread to Germany as the anti-Swedish coalition invaded Swedish Pomerania, capturing the islands of Wolin and Usedom, as well as Stettin (Szczecin) in 1713. In pursuit of allies, Sweden's enemies offered neutral Prussia to hold guardianship over the conquests, an offer which the ambitious Frederick William I accepted. Charles XII of Sweden launched a preemptive strike to retake Usedom on 21 April 1715, to prevent the allies from utilising its waterways against Stralsund. All Prussians troops were forcibly removed from the island by the 27th, resulting in a Prussian declaration of war. In July, Prussia, Denmark–Norway, and Saxony blockaded Stralsund.

An invasion of Usedom was deemed necessary to have equipment shipped to the blockading army, and to cut Stralsund off from Sweden proper by capturing Rügen. A Prussian–Saxon army crossed the Swine (Świna) strait from Wolin on 31 July 1715, compelling Charles to withdraw to the last strong-point on the island, Peenemünde Sconce. A small Swedish rearguard that was covering the retreat was cut down. Charles quit the sconce the next day and instructed its commander to fight to the end. It was taken by storm on 22 August, with the allies suffering heavy losses and the entire garrison being killed or captured.

The loss of Usedom weakened the Swedish defence of the Greifswald bay, which protected the island of Rügen from an allied invasion. A Danish fleet forced an entry into the bay on 25 September. A formal siege of Stralsund began on 19 October, with the start of trench-digging and artillery bombardment. On 15 November, the allies landed on Rügen as the Swedes were occupied in the front. Charles counter-attacked but was repulsed, resulting in the loss of the island and the inevitable fall of Stralsund. Charles escaped the encirclement on 22 December, and Stralsund surrendered the next day. The city was returned to Sweden by the treaties of Stockholm and Frederiksborg, but Usedom, Wolin and Stettin were ceded to Prussia.

== Background ==
=== Invasion of Swedish Pomerania ===
Island of Usedom within Swedish Pomerania

During his Ottoman exile following the defeat at Poltava, Charles XII planned to use Swedish Pomerania as a staging point for new offensives into the Polish–Lithuanian Commonwealth and Russia in conjunction with the Ottomans. Wishing to save Sweden's German dominions, however, Arvid Horn and the Swedish council signed The Hague agreement of 1710 which declared them neutral, thwarting any plans of a Swedish offensive and alliance with the Ottomans. Consequentially, Charles rejected the neutrality-agreement and demoted or dismissed several civilian and military key figures whom he deemed too defensively minded or incompetent.

In September 1711, Frederick IV with 22,000 Danes, and Augustus II with 20,000 Poles, Saxons and Russians invaded Swedish Pomerania from the west and southeast, respectively. Their numbers compelled the Swedish commander Carl Gustaf Dücker to concentrate his 11,000-man army at Stralsund and Stettin (Szczecin), leaving most of Pomerania defenceless. The first allied Siege of Stralsund ended in failure as most Danes withdrew from Pomerania in January 1712, having lost up to a third of their army. But they still held the city under blockade. 20,000 more Russians arrived in July. Peter I and Augustus tried but failed to take the Rügen island in September. Stralsund and Stettin were given temporary respite later that month when an army under Magnus Stenbock was shipped over from Sweden. Following a brilliant victory at Gadebusch, Stenbock capitulated at Tönning in May 1713.

=== Rising Prussian–Swedish tensions ===
Stettin was captured by the allies on 6 October 1713 and its commander, Johan August Meijerfeldt, accepted the terms of the Schwedt treaty; neutral Holstein-Gottorp and Prussia would administrate Stettin until a conclusive ruling-agreement was reached, with Sweden covering the 400,000 thalers that Prussia had paid Russia for the city. The treaty was, nevertheless, deemed illegal by Charles who futilely demanded Frederick William I to return the city. Tensions rose in 1714, with the Prussian acquirement of the Swedish ferry-town of Wolgast and the island of Usedom by Sweden's enemies. The allies withdrew from Stralsund in October, a month prior to Charles arrival at the city after several years in exile.

Recognising neither Usedom nor Wolgast as part of the Schwedt treaty, Charles sent a Swedish detachment to retake the latter on 23 February 1715. The Prussian garrison was forcibly removed and shipped over to Usedom. The Swedish king was well-aware of the ongoing negotiations between Prussia and his enemies, (Note: On 7 and 14 April, agreements were concluded between Prussia, Denmark and Hannover, which proclaimed that Stettin and parts of Vorpommern would fall to Prussia, in exchange for Prussian military support against Stralsund.) and Frederick William's ambitions to permanently keep the occupied territory. As further diplomacy stalled, and war against Prussia seemed inevitable, he decided on a preemptive strike against Usedom before the Prussians consolidated their hold of the island. Usedom was crucial in the defence of Stralsund, as it protected vital waterways leading to the city. Some 3,000 men were assembled for the task. Lieutenant colonel von Jeetze commanded more than 300 Prussians on the island.

== Swedish reconquest of Usedom ==
=== Plan of attack ===
Charles XII planned for 300–400 men to land on the eastern side of Peenemünde and dislodge any Prussians along the main road over Pudagla to the town of Usedom, to deny reinforcements from that direction. Additional troops would be shipped over along the Peene strait near Wolgast, to enclose Wolgaster Fähre (opposite Wolgast) and the Peenemünde sconce, before advancing upon Swine Sconce further east. The latter had been partially destroyed in a Swedish raid in 1712. He estimated that 14 days would be enough to starve them out. Violence would only be used if necessary – the two nations were not yet at war with each other.

=== Preemptive strike ===
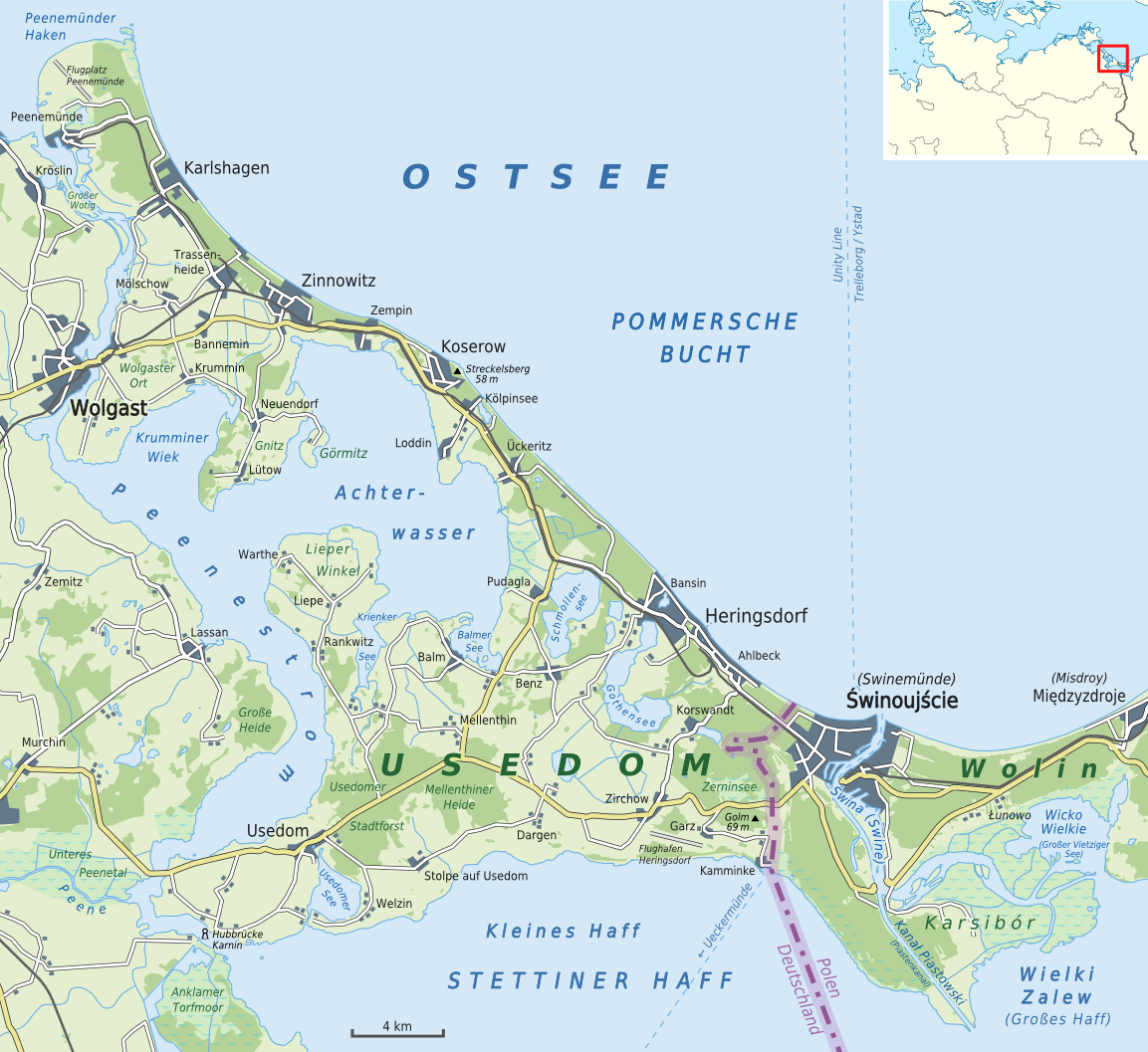
Map of Usedom in present time

Accordingly, a Swedish fleet, consisting of 500 men onboard three frigates and seven or eight smaller ships under vice admiral Mikael Henck, sailed to Peenemünde where the small force landed on Easter of 21 April. Some 100 Prussians standing as reserve within the municipality were captured in the Swedish advance. Meanwhile, the fleet proceeded along the Peene strait to Wolgast and shipped over the land forces under Dücker the following day, which had marched from Stralsund. The Swedish activity was observed by Rohr, the Prussian captain at Peenemünde Sconce, who notified major general Schwendi at Wolin. At Wolgaster Fähre, the Swedes initially ignored the 19-man strong redoubt but captured the captain and 76 men lying outside. Rohr and his garrison of 123 men were after some time also enclosed.

The Swedes proceeded further onto the island towards the last strong-point Swine Sconce, near today's Świnoujście, which guarded the mouth of the Swine (Świna) strait and crossing over to Wolin. The garrison's nominal strength was 40 men. The fleet simultaneously sailed into the Swine in support. When Swedish infantry arrived at the sconce on 23 April, its commander sub-lieutenant von Plotho ignored their demands to surrender and opened fire. Charles then commenced a storm, (Note: According to Tuxen and With-Seidelin, the storm was undertaken on 25 April. Voges, however, makes references to a letter from 24 April, mentioning the storm. According to Poetzsch, there was no bloodshed.) which cost five or six killed and 20 wounded all together, including mortally wounded von Plotho. Three 3-pounder guns were also captured. The Swedish conquest of the island was completed by the 27th when Rohr surrendered Peenemünde Sconce (Note: According to Haintz, in contradiction to the description by Tuxen and With-Seidelin, Peenemünde Sconce was taken by storm.) due to inadequate provisions.

The Prussians made no attempts to reinforce Usedom during the action; having received reports from general Schwendi, 500 infantry and some cavalry arrived at Wolin from Stettin to block a continued Swedish advance. This force gradually increased to nine battalions and ten squadrons as the Prussians erroneously assumed Charles would continue his offensive into Poland. (Note: Defoe makes the case that Charles planned to land an army near Copenhagen, after taking Usedom, to burn the Danish naval fleet. But that the naval Battle of Fehmarn thwarted these plans.) Since Sweden and Prussia were not formally at war, most captured Prussians were sent over to their comrades at Wolin with all their firearms and equipment. The ones captured at Wolgaster Fähre were instead escorted to Anklam. The conquest of Usedom made the Swedes masters over the Stettin lagoon and the imminent waterways, the Swine and Peene straits.

== Intermediate phase ==
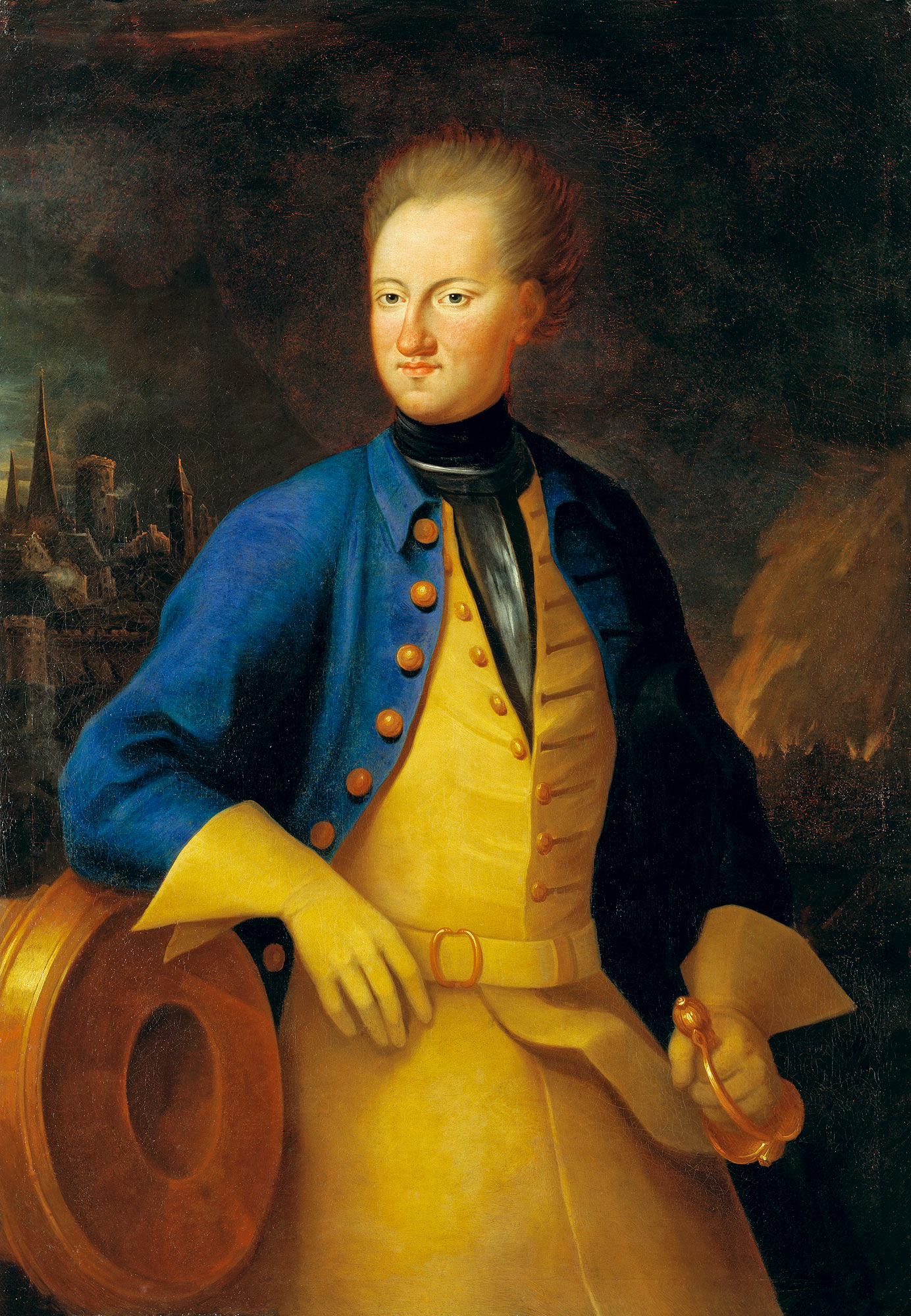
Charles XII of Sweden, by Axel Sparre in 1712–1715

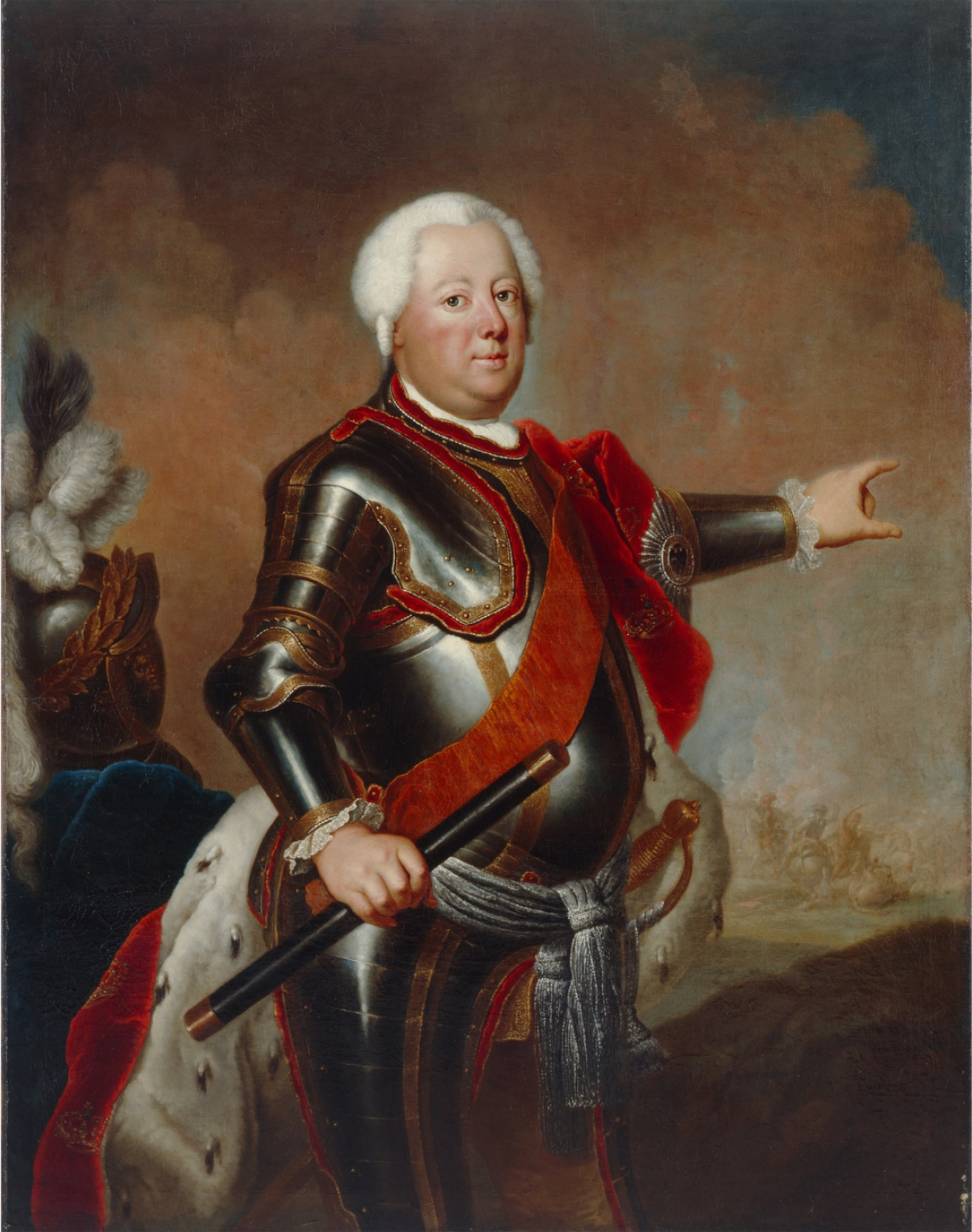
Frederick William I of Prussia, by Antoine Pesne after 1733

=== Prussian declaration of war ===
In response, Frederick William I expelled the Swedish ambassador in Berlin and declared war on 1 May 1715. The Holstein-Gottorp troops in Stettin, whom Frederick William viewed as Swedish auxiliaries, were imprisoned. The Prussian king assembled his army at Stettin, with defences stretching along the Peene river, whilst awaiting the results of allied negotiations before going on the offensive. Eight small Swedish privateers on the lagoon and waterways began harassing the Prussians, which would prevent them from transporting artillery via Anklam and the Greifswald harbour to Stralsund.

Skirmishes began on 16 June, (Note: According to Nordberg, the Prussians attacked on 14 June. Poetzsch writes that the attack occurred in the first half of May, and that the Swedes had nine men.) when Prussian troops crossed the Peene between Loitz and Demmin and overwhelmed a small Swedish outpost of 30 men. Charles arrived at Loitz the next day and ordered lieutenant colonel Johan Segersten (later Stenflycht) to retaliate. On 18 June, (Note: According to Voges, the retaliation-attack began on 17 June, and 9 June according to Poetzsch.) with 200 cavalry and 200 infantry, he drove the Prussians back over the river. The redoubts at Jarmen, Gützkow and Stolpe were also destroyed by Segersten who continued south-east along the Peene before heading back with 100 POWs. Charles got separated from his troops in the offensive and was nearly captured. With 100 cavalry-reinforcements, Segersten once again crossed the river with 300 cavalry (Note: According to Poetzsch, 400 cavalry arrived as reinforcements for the Neubrandenburg offensive, boosting the total force to at least 600 cavalry.) and advanced towards Neubrandenburg, capturing 130 Prussians. In total, 200–270 Prussians were made POWs at the Peene, of whom 161 were exchanged with troops imprisoned at Stettin.

=== Stralsund offensive ===
Negotiations finalised by the month's end and the offensive began. The allies had 50,000 men, against 12,000–13,000 Swedes. The Danes broke into Swedish Pomerania on 8 July. The Prussian–Saxon army crossed the Peene the next day, following a small skirmish. The Swedes offered only sporadic resistance, and abandoned Greifswald in their retreat. The allies reached Stralsund on the 14th, and began the construction of a contravallation line two days later. But to capture the city, they first had to cut it off from Sweden proper by taking the Rügen island, which required naval supremacy over the Greifswald bay. With the approach of the winter freeze, time was of the essence.

After some fighting, which got Christen Sehested's Danish fleet trapped by the Stralsund fleet in the southeastern part of the bay, this was deemed impossible so long as Sweden controlled the Usedom and Ruden islands; an invasion of Usedom was necessary to utilise its vital waterways for Prussian artillery transports to Stralsund, and for Sehested's fleet to collect fresh water, which the Swedish cavalry effectively prevented. Hence, on 24 July, Frederick William ordered the invasion. To enable troop shipments over the Peene strait to Usedom, the Prussians first captured Wolgast and its castle on 27–29 July after some resistance. (Note: The 160-man strong garrison either surrendered (Nordberg), or evacuated (Voges, Haintz, Tuxen and With-Seidelin).)

== Allied invasion of Usedom ==
At dawn on 31 July 1715, a Prussian–Saxon force of 2,000 infantry and 800 cavalry (Note: According to Voges: 300 grenadiers, 700 fusiliers, 1,000 musketeers and 800 cavalry. According to Voltaire: 1,500 infantry and 800 cavalry.) under general Georg von Arnim began crossing the Swine from Wolin. The main column under von Arnim crossed just north of Swine Sconce, and a second column under Saxon major Frederick Louis of Württemberg-Winnental further south. On Usedom, Swedish general Christian Grothusen commanded between 600 and 800 men. He prepared to receive the allies above Swine Sconce, opposite the main crossing, with 400 infantry and some cavalry, or 600 men in total. When Charles arrived and saw Grothusen's vulnerable position, he ordered a withdrawal; this was also done to avoid being cut off in the rear in case of an allied attack over Wolgast. 13 dragoons remained to observe the enemy while the rest of the Swedish force withdrew.

=== Swedish retreat ===
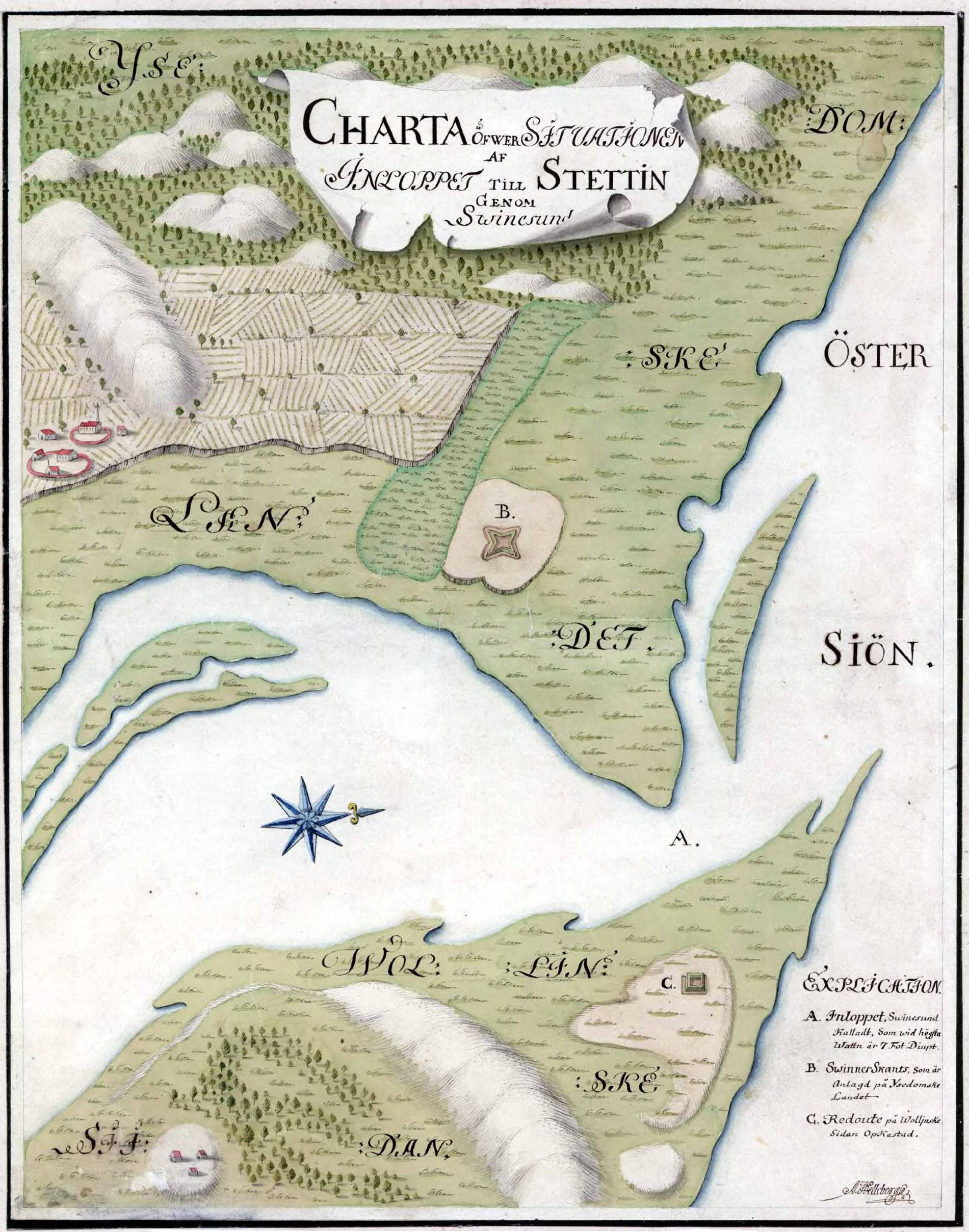
Swine Sconce, at the mouth of the Swine (Świna) strait

The first allied cavalry landed an hour later to secure a beachhead, routing the Swedish dragoons after a brief skirmish. Pursued by Prussian cavalry, the dragoons ran into a forest grove where Charles rode at the end of the column with but a few companions; including Stanisław Poniatowski, father of future Polish king Stanisław II August. Charles' horse was shot under him in the ensuing tumult. A companion, Gustaf Fredrik von Rosen, offered up his own horse so that the king could reform with the infantry in the rearguard, (Note: In Voges description of events, Charles concealed his infantry in the woods to surprise the allied cavalry.) whose two accurate volleys repulsed the Prussian attack.

To buy time for Charles to retreat through Koserow to Peenemünde Sconce with the army, Jönköping major Holzapfel with about 200 men (Note: According to Nordberg and Poetzsch, Holzapfel had 300 men. It is unclear if this number includes the 100 men under Waseburg that was marching from Kaseburg. Voges estimates the rearguard at 250 men; he also cites sources mentioning a mere 100 and even 80 Swedes, which he finds dubious. In Poetzsch's description, Holzapfel's retreat began from southern Swine – from where Waseburg would otherwise retreat. This is conflicting with those of Haintz, Tuxen and With-Seidelin, and Voges.) stayed behind. The Prussians restored order and attacked anew, forcing Holzapfel's infantry to form square. The formation shattered after a fierce scuffle, costing the allies 60–70 cavalry (including a major); Holzapfel with about 90 Swedes were killed and 50–60 captured. Swine Sconce with its 20-man garrison, possibly including survivors of Holzapfel's force, was captured that same day. (Note: According to Nordberg and Poetzsch, Holzapfel's final battle was fought in Swine Sconce, having marched there by mistake instead of following Charles as intended. Haintz writes about a preceding battle with Charles at the mouth of the Swine, before the Swine sconce with a garrison of 200 cavalry (!) was stormed. According to Voges, the garrison was cut off and surrendered without a fight. Tuxen and With-Seidelin mentions no fighting over Swine Sconce at this time. According to Voltaire, the ruined sconce was abandoned by the Swedes.) The Prussian cavalry, whose original objective was to cut off the Swedish force, was now too exhausted to pursue Charles, who reached safety within Peenemünde Sconce in the evening. Prussian infantry was harassed by enemy warships as they marched along the beach in pursuit. At Pudagla, they captured three Swedish guns, all their tents and Grothusen's entire baggage which had been abandoned in the retreat. Another Swedish column of 100 men under Captain Waseburg, withdrawing from Kaseburg (Karsibór), was cut off in the open and forced to surrender.

The allies controlled the whole island the next day, except for Peenemünde Sconce. In total, the Swedes lost seven guns, and 200 to 300 men (including Waseburg's force). Another source admits to only 100 Swedish losses. The allies are estimated to have lost about 100 killed and wounded, with another source mentioning up to 300 losses. Following 2 August, the allies began shipping troops over from Wolgast, with some 1,000 infantry and 400 cavalry arriving.

=== Fighting over the Stettin lagoon ===
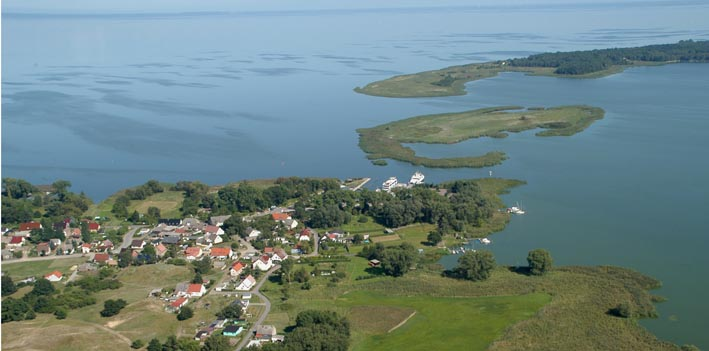
Altwarp, facing northeast, where the fighting on 8 August took place

The Swedish retreat and loss of Swine Scone gave the allies access to the Swine. To pave the way for the transports, Sehested sent Captain Boysen through the strait on 4 August with one frigate, one pram, two snows and eight sloops, to cut off the seven Swedish privateers on the Stettin lagoon under Captain Unbehaven. The Swedes were still entrapping Sehested in the Greifswald bay at this time. Boysen reached the lagoon two days later and anchored just south of Lubin, but the frigate had run aground in the strait. For four hours, the two fleets clashed outside Altwarp on the 8th, (Note: According to Poetzsch, the battle outside Altwarp was fought no sooner than 10 August.) resulting in a Danish withdrawal with eleven men killed. Unbehaven's pursuit was stopped only by the Prussian land batteries on the Lubin mountains.

The major naval Battle of Rügen was fought that same day, of which outcome allowed Sehested's fleet to escape the entrapment and shift focus to the Stettin lagoon. On 11 August, with three ships in reinforcements as well as Prussian and Saxon infantry, Boysen attacked anew. Unbehaven quickly withdrew before their overwhelming forces, reaching safety the next day as he sailed out of the Peene strait (Note: According to Voges, Unbehaven exited the mouth of the Peene strait on 13 August.) and rendezvoused with parts of the Stralsund fleet operating in the Greifswald bay. He lost more than half of his crew to the allied land batteries that had been constructed along the strait, but no ships – Unbehaven's fleet would have been trapped in the strait had Peenemünde Sconce been lost at this time.

=== Storming of Peenemünde Sconce ===
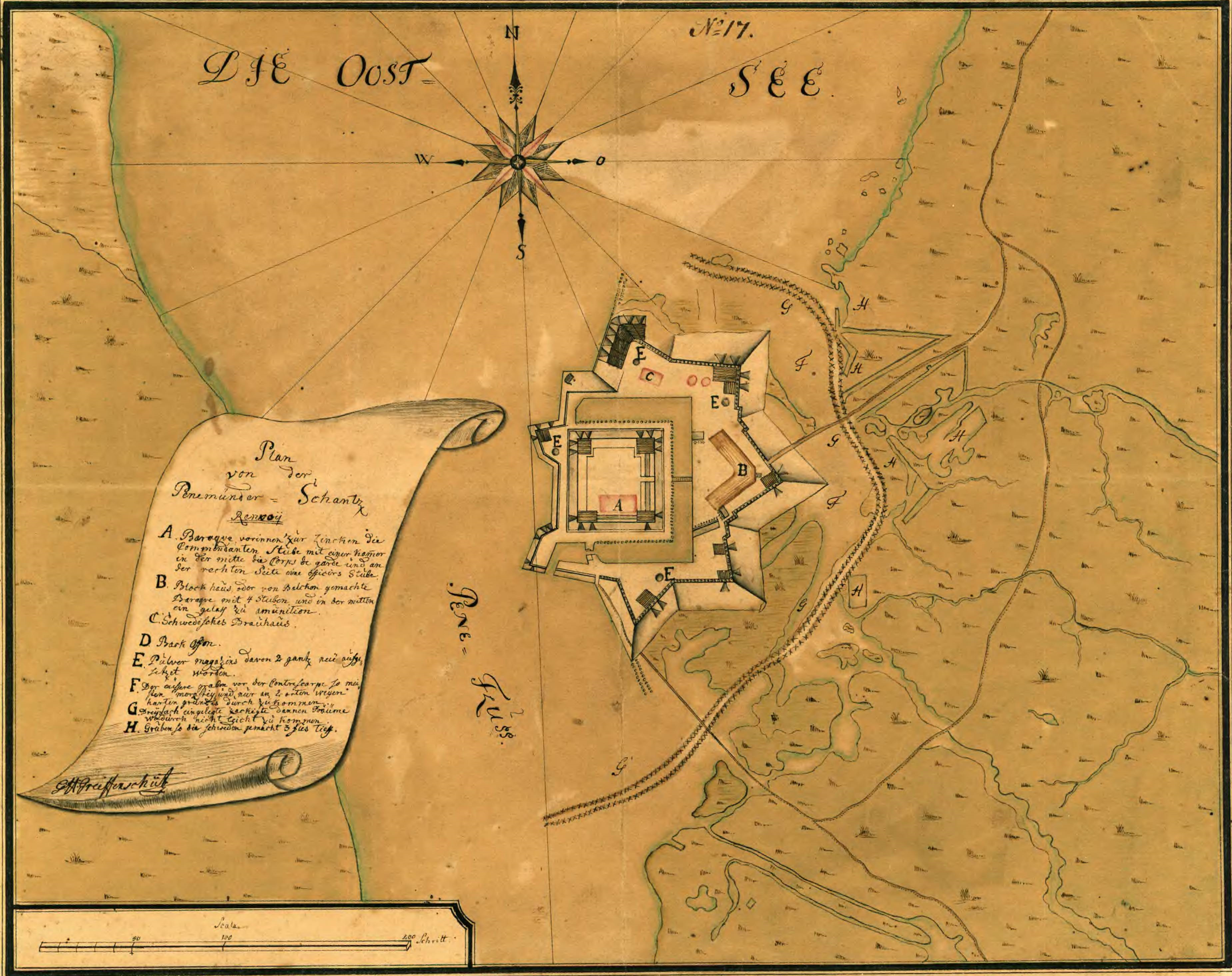
Peenemünde Sconce, some time following the capture

Charles quit Peenemünde Sconce for Ruden on 1 August along with the cavalry, leaving lieutenant-colonel Johan Kuse with 263–269 men (Note: On page 174, Voges specifies: One lieutenant colonel, one major, five captains, five lieutenants, three ensigns, 16 non-commissioned officers and 232 privates. On page 172, however, a total of 269 is given. Other estimates include: 450 (Nordberg); 300 (Prussian); 250 (Voltaire); 240 (Ordinaire Stockholmiske Posttidender).) and 13 cannons. It was rumoured that he intended to return at the head of 6,000 men. The stone-built sconce was rectangle-shaped – 73 m × 66 m × 6 m (240 ft × 217 ft × 20 ft) – enclosed by a two metre deep inner-moat, a star-shaped covertway and glacis, and an outer-moat protected by stakes. Situated on the northwestern tip of Usedom, the sconce was surrounded by the Peene strait to the west, from where it could receive naval support, and swampland to the east.

The allies deemed it necessary to capture the sconce before winter to utilise the strait for transports. On 4 August, von Arnim arrived with the main forces. They began digging trenches and constructing batteries on the 18th, with the arrival of 17 cannons, two mortars and two howitzers from Stralsund. A heavy bombardment commenced the next day, with Swedish privateers returning fire. As the trench system reached 200 paces in two parallels on the 21st, von Arnim prepared to storm the sconce under the cover of a forward battery of 30 hand mortar; majors von Behr and Erlach, and lieutenant colonel von Winterfeldt, would lead the right, left and centre columns, respectively, and colonel von der Lieppen the reserve.

Hold your fire until the enemy is at the edge of the moat; defend yourselves until the last drop of your blood; I wish you the best of luck.

— Charles XII.

About 300 grenadiers formed the first wave in the three columns, with 350 fusiliers divided behind them in a second wave, and 400 more fusiliers in reserve. There were seven officers and 18 engineers with axes in addition to every 100 men. Early on 22 August, the sconce was heavily bombarded (Note: According to Defoe, no breaches were made to the sconce's walls, while Poetzsch, Summerfield and Kling mention two breaches.) until the signal to storm was given at 3 a.m. The first wave reaching the outer-moat was repulsed by a volley of musket- and canister shot. With the second wave, order was restored and the allies pressed on over the water- and stake filled moat to the glacis. Despite detonating land mines and mounting losses, the allies reached the inner-moat. The Swedes withdrew into the sconce itself, which was pelted with grenades. The attack stalled until the reserve arrived, (Note: According to Defoe, these included three fresh battalions.) and the allies crossed the inner-moat and climbed the ramparts to engage the Swedes in fierce hand-to-hand combat. Commander Kuse assembled his surviving troops for a last stand in a small bastion where they could not be surrounded. He soon fell, and his successor Johan Beckenström was quickly wounded, at which point the defence collapsed.

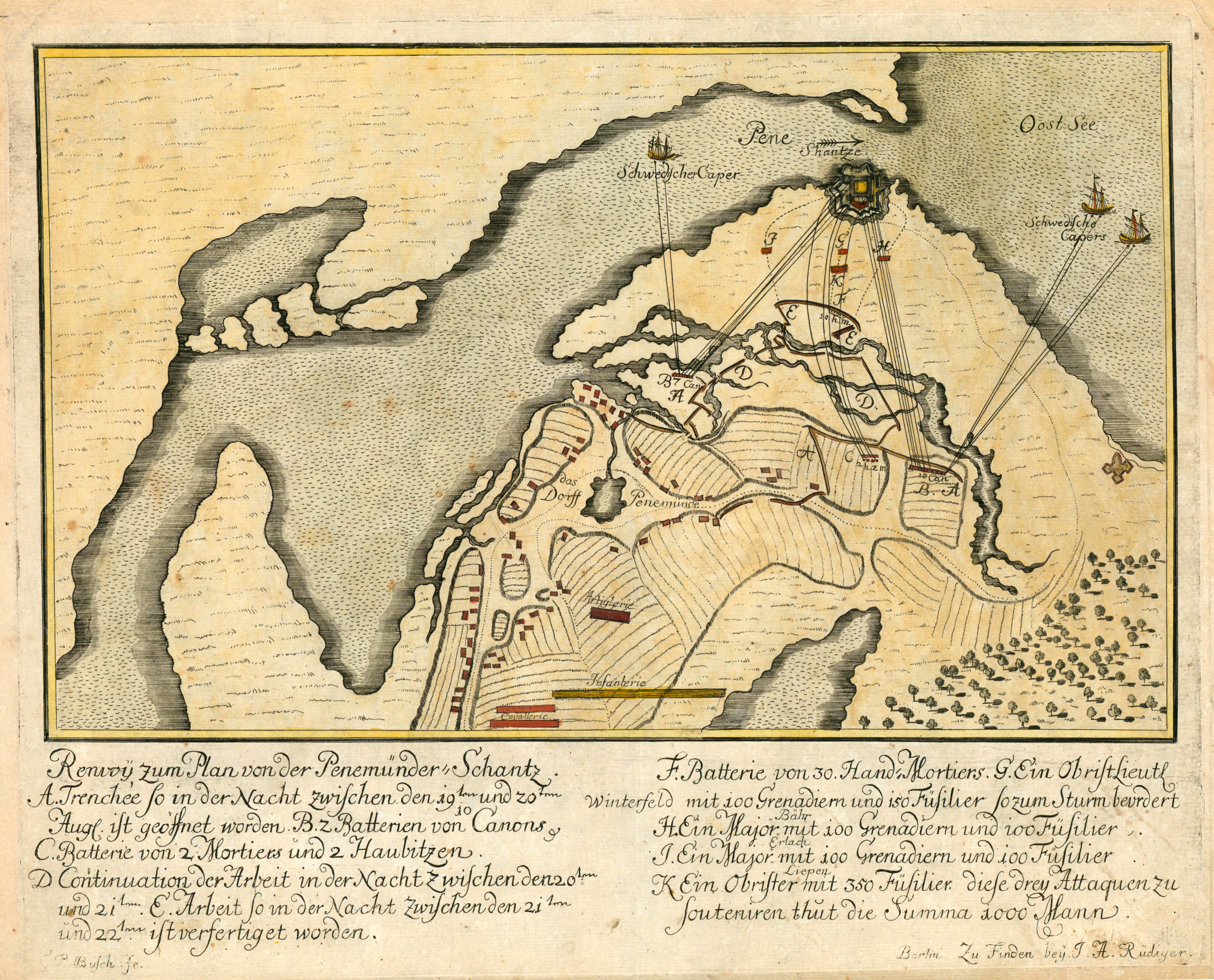
Siege and storm of Peenemünde Sconce

During the three hours of fighting, Kuse with 57 men were killed, 68 severely wounded, and some 130 captured. The allies lost von der Lieppen, von Winterfeldt, von Behr and 151 men killed, while Erlach and 454 others were wounded. Prussian claims alleged that Kuse was struck down by one of his own men after driving them on too fiercely, but Defoe considers this dubious in his anonymous biography about the Swedish king.

For Peenemünde Sconce, the enemy has lost more men than such a sconce is worth, and with less effort can be regained.

— Charles XII.

== Aftermath ==
Allied control over Usedom gave them full access to its imminent waterways and severely weakened Sweden's hold over Greifswald Bay. For shipments to reach Greifswald and be transported to Stralsund, the bay had to be secured. However, because the enterprise was delayed with the prolonged siege and capture of Peenemünde Sconce, (Note: According to Tuxen and With-Seidelin, it was the threat of Unbehaven, whose ships had escaped to Ruden following the battle on 25 September, which caused the Prussians to escort the artillery by land.) the Prussians resorted to escort their artillery by land. Sehested's Danish fleet forced an entry into the bay on 25 September, gaining naval supremacy. This allowed for shipments of equipment, ammunition and transporting-vessels, and paved the way for an invasion of Rügen. On 19 October, the allied artillery opened fire against Stralsund while the infantry began digging trenches towards its outer works.

=== Fall of Stralsund ===
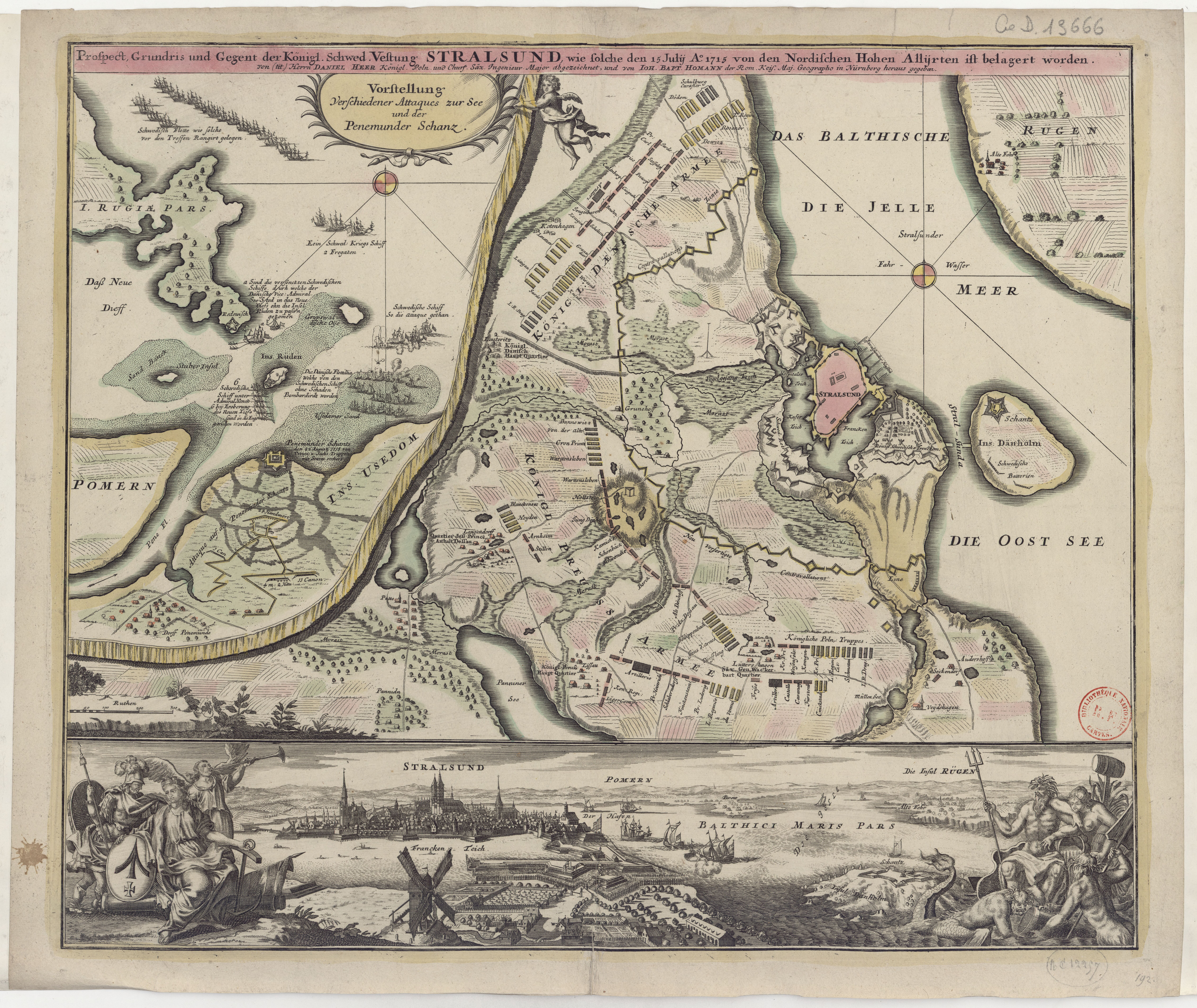
Siege of Stralsund 1715, with Usedom in the embedded picture (top-left)

Due to miscalculations and heavy storms, the Rügen-operation was not undertaken until 15 November, (Note: The Rügen-operation – which was originally planned for early July – was several months behind schedule because of preparations, indecisiveness, miscalculations, bad weather, and the energetic defense of Charles.) when 17,219–20,000 allies in 438–640 transporting vessels began landing at Gross Stresow. On Rügen, Charles XII commanded about 4,000–5,000 men. The allies fortified their beachhead in case of a Swedish counterattack. Charles attacked Stresow at night with 2,000 men, but was repulsed. The allied conquest of Rügen was cemented with the Swedish surrender of Altefähr Sconce two days later. Charles, having rejoined the garrison in Stralsund, was thus cut off from Sweden proper in a city whose fall was now inevitable. The Swedish force on Ruden quit the island on 21 November and sailed for Sweden.

What preceded and followed the allied landing on 5 November were several assaults on Stralsund's outer works and Swedish sorties, often under Charles' personal command. On 19 December, with the allies preparing for a general storm of the city, Charles reluctantly agreed to negotiate. On the 22nd, he escaped the allied encirclement on a galiot heading for Sweden, while Dücker surrendered the city the next day. Charles arrived at Trelleborg on the 24th and began preparing for new offensives. This resulted in two unsuccessful invasions of Norway in 1716 and 1718, the latter in which he was killed. The loss of Stralsund, and later Wismar on 18 April 1716, deprived Sweden of its last German possessions. Both cities were returned by the peace treaties of Stockholm and Frederiksborg in 1720, while Usedom, Wolin and Stettin were ceded to Prussia.

== Sources ==
=== Bibliography ===
- Carlson, Ernst (1893). Konung Karl XII:s egenhändiga bref (in Swedish). Stockholm: P. A. Norstedt & Söner. OCLC 14112870.
- Defoe, Daniel (1720). The History of the Wars, of His Late Majesty Charles XII, King of Sweden. London: A. Bell. OCLC 642660555.
- Frigander (1738). Leben und Thaten Des Welt-beruhmten Konigl. Pohln. und Chur-Furstl. Sachsischen General-Feld-Marschalls (in German). Eisenach: Michael Gottlieb Greissbach. OCLC 707092601.
- Haintz, Otto (1958). König Karl XII. von Schweden: Der Ausgang der Königstragödie (1715–1719) (in German). Vol. 3. Berlin: Walter de Gruyter GmbH & Co KG. OCLC 900892743.
- Kling, Steve; Summerfield, Stephen (2015). Great Northern War Compendium: Frederick William I and Prussia's Involvement in the Great Northern War. Vol. 2. St. Louis: THGC Publishing. ISBN 978-0-9964557-3-2.
- Nordberg, Jöran (1740). Konung Carl den XII:tes Historia (in Swedish). Vol. 2. Stockholm: P. Momma (P.J. Nyström). OCLC 256603540.
- "Ordinaire Stockholmiske Posttidender : Af den 13 Septembris". Post- och Inrikes Tidningar (in Swedish). No. 37. Stockholm: Kanslikollegium. 1715. OCLC 660060850.
- Poetzsch, Johnny (2018). Phoenix –Den återuppståndne. Försvaret av Stralsund och de svenska provinserna i Nordtyskland 1710-1716 (in Swedish). Falun: Poetzsch historica. ISBN 978-91-984484-0-5.
- Tuxen, August; With-Seidelin, Carl (1922). Bidrag til den store nordiske krigs historie: Erobringen af Sverigs tyske provinser 1715-1716 (in Danish). Vol. 7. Copenhagen: Det Nordiske forlag, bogforl. E. Bojesen. OCLC 928686824.
- Voges, Hermann (1903). Baltische Studien : Beiträge zur Geschichte des Feldzuges von 1715 (in German). Vol. 7. Stettin: Druck von Herrcke & Lebeling. ISSN 0067-3099.
- Voges, Hermann (1904). Baltische Studien : Beiträge zur Geschichte des Feldzuges von 1715 (Fortsetzung) (in German). Vol. 8. Stettin: Druck von Herrcke & Lebeling. ISSN 0067-3099.
- Voges, Hermann (1905). Baltische Studien : Beiträge zur Geschichte des Feldzuges von 1715. Schluß (in German). Vol. 9. Stettin: Druck von Herrcke & Lebeling. ISSN 0067-3099.
- Voltaire (1732). The History of Charles XII. King of Sweden (2 ed.). London: Printed for Alexander Lyon. OCLC 13247273.
- von Wiring, Thomas (1716). Des nun schon in die 16. Jahr währenden Nordischen Kriegs, Anfang, Fortgang, und nunmehro Gott gebe! bald zu erwartender Aussgang (in German). Hamburg: Wiring. OCLC 1256153519.
