= Battle of Palanga =

1700 minor battle of the Great Northern War

- Part of the Great Northern War
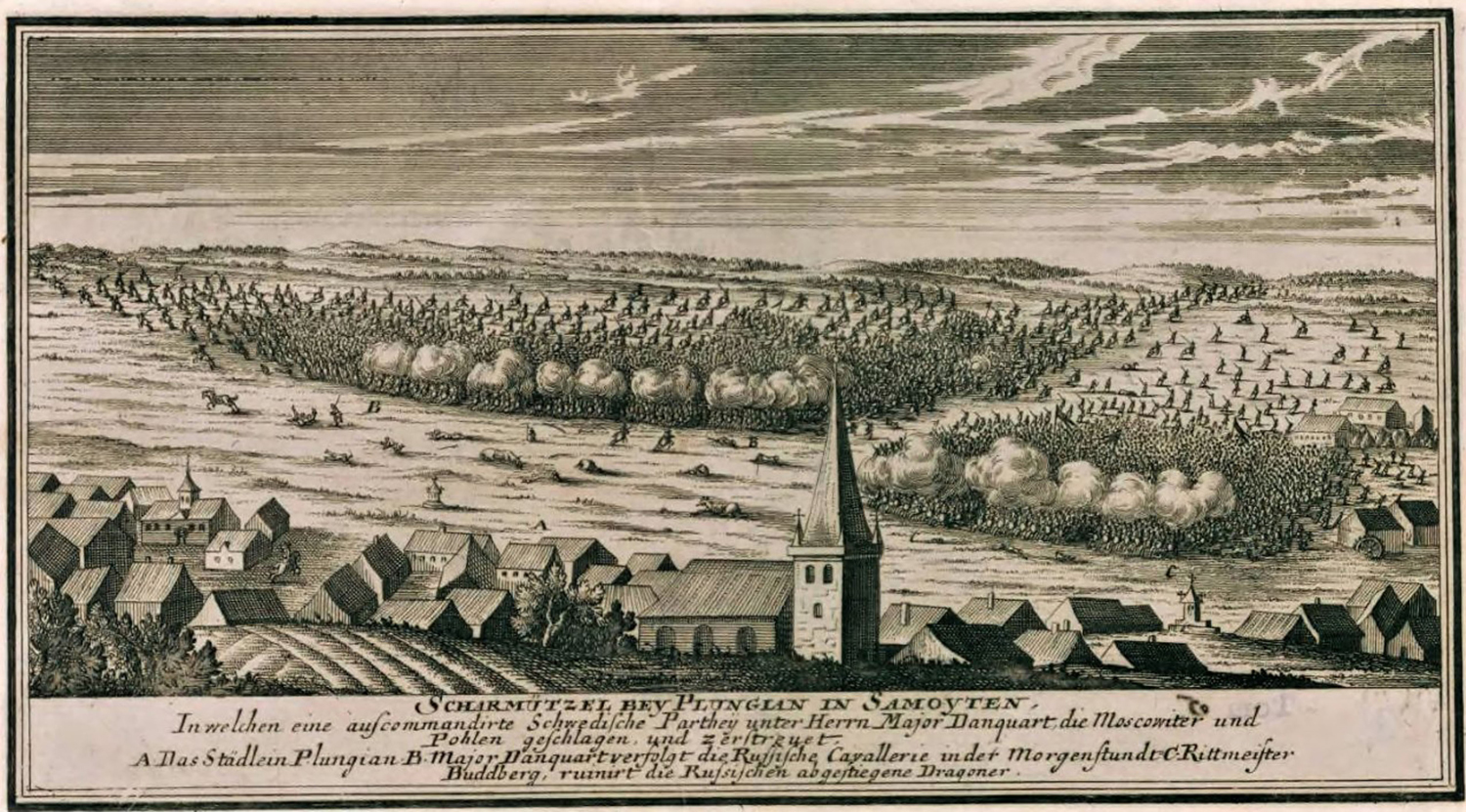
- Battle of Palanga in 1705
Date	2 February 1705 (O.S.); 3 February 1705 (Swedish calendar); 13 February 1705 (N.S.)
Location	Palanga, Samogitia, Lithuania
Result	Swedish victory

Belligerents
Swedish Empire	Tsardom of Russia; Polish–Lithuanian Commonwealth

Commanders and leaders
Joachim Danckwardt	Iwan Stephan Gogaron Morbirun

Strength
387 cavalry	1,600 cavalry 400–500 cavalry

Casualties and losses
5 killed 55 wounded	300 killed 50 captured

The Battle of Palanga, or the Battle of Polangen, was fought on 13 February 1705 between a Swedish army commanded by Joachim Danckwardt and a Russian–Lithuanian army under Iwan Stephan Gogaron Morbirun. Danckwardt was sent to Palanga in Samogitia with 387 cavalry to reopen the line of communication between Courland and eastern Prussia, in which he was successful. The Russians and Lithuanians gathered a force of about 2,000 cavalry and intercepted him at Palanga. Danckwardt was able to fend off their attacks for a while, before winning the battle with a counterattack against their lines. The Swedish detachment then participated in Lewenhaupt's short-lived offensive in Samogitia. At the Battle of Gemauerthof later that year, Danckwardt was killed in action.

== Background ==
After the successful Crossing of the Düna in 1701, the Swedish army invaded and conquered Courland, a possession of the Polish Crown. In September, Charles XII of Sweden allied himself with the Sapieha family in the ongoing Lithuanian power struggle, for their support against Augustus II (ruler of the Polish–Lithuanian Commonwealth). In December, Charles XII invaded the Duchy of Samogitia (Lithuania) and drove out all enemies of the Sapiehas. As the Swedish main army proceeded into Poland towards Kraków the following year, a small detachment was left behind to protect Courland. Several encounters occurred between the Swedish Courland Corps and Russian and Polish–Lithuanian armies in 1702–1704; most notably at Saločiai and Jakobstadt. To aid Augustus against Charles XII and the newly elected Polish king Stanisław Leszczyński, Czar Peter I sent the vanguard of the Russian main army—which had previously been used against Swedish Ingria and Livonia—into northeastern Lithuania in September 1704.

The vanguard was led by Anikita Repnin, who was instructed to gather supplies at Polotsk for the Russian main army and to lift the Swedish siege of the Biržai Castle, bordering Courland and Lithuania. The commander of the Courland Corps, Adam Ludwig Lewenhaupt, withdrew to Courland after having captured and subsequently demolished the castle on 20 October. Repnin then sent Russian forces under Ewald Rönne into Samogitia together with the allied Lithuanians. The Swedish line of communication between Courland (Liepāja) and eastern Prussia (Klaipėda) was cut for several weeks.

On 4 or 5 January 1705, Lewenhaupt sent major Joachim Danckwardt from Joniškis towards Palanga to secure it. His force consisted of 237 cavalry from the Uppland Estate Dragoons (also known as the Uppland Priest Dragoons), and 150 cavalry from the Nyland Cavalry Regiment and the Estonian Banner of Nobles. (Note: The numbers and regiments involved vary depending on the source used: According to a contemporary description, there were 150 cavalry from the Estonian Banner of Nobles and 237 cavalry from the Nyland Cavalry Regiment; according to Nordberg and Heubel, there were 250 cavalry from the Estonian Banner of Nobles and 237 cavalry from the Uppland Estate Dragoons; according to Faber, there were 375 cavalry in total. According to the strength report of 11 November 1704, only 27 cavalry from the Estonian Banner of Nobles and 133 cavalry from the Nyland Cavalry Regiment were present (160 men), while the Uppland Estate Dragoons had 254 men present (including Danckwardt).) After having beaten several detachments of Grzegorz Antoni Ogiński's Lithuanians in January, chasing them as far as to the Prussian border, the line of communication was reopened. Danckwardt then marched back to Palanga and forced the inhabitants on money and supplies.

== Battle ==
After a while, Danckwardt received orders to rendezvous with Lewenhaupt at Kelmė, to participate in his newly commenced offensive into Samogitia. However, Danckwardt also gained knowledge of a large enemy force merely 21.5 km (13 mi) away, which was marching to intercept him; it was led by Iwan Stephan Gogaron Morbirun and consisted of 1,600 Russian cavalry and dragoons, and 400 (5 companies), or 500 of Ogiński's pancerni cavalry. Danckwardt took a position inside Palanga, where he awaited them for several days.

Morbirun finally arrived on the foggy morning of 13 February, at 04:00–05:00. (Note: 22 February according to Faber.) The Lithuanians, with their faster horses, launched a quick surprise attack on the town. Near 40 of them made it inside and began shooting wildly, before being repulsed. The Russians and Lithuanians then remained outside the town for the most part and fired upon the Swedes for several hours to little effect. Danckwardt was hesitant towards attacking them since the fog made it impossible for the combatants to clearly see each other. At 06:30, the fog began clearing up and Danckwardt could finally see the enemies on the open field, drawn up in a battle formation of two lines. He organized his force into three groups of 14 troops: He took personal command over the left group, consisting of nine troops; two troops were left with the baggage train to secure the rear; Leonhard Budberg was given command over the right group, consisting of the remaining troops.

Around 08:00, at the signal: "I Jesu Namn!" (In the Name of Jesus!), the Swedes charged out sword in hand. Despite receiving three volleys, Danckwardt's group charged with such vigour that the allies' right flank quickly panicked and ran. Danckwardt, with two ryttmästare and 70 men, pursued them for 5.35 km (3 mi) before returning to the aid of Budberg. Budberg's group engaged the Russian dragoons at the allies' left flank, which resisted fiercely until they were completely overthrown with 200 men killed. Some dismounted dragoons sought shelter within the nearby houses where one lieutenant and 28 privates were later made prisoners of war.

In total, the loss of the Russians and Lithuanians amounted to 300 killed and 50 captured. One Swedish ryttmästare and four privates had been killed, as well as 18 horses. One lieutenant, one cornet, four corporals, and 49 privates were wounded; at least three Swedes succumbed to their wounds in the following days.

== Aftermath ==
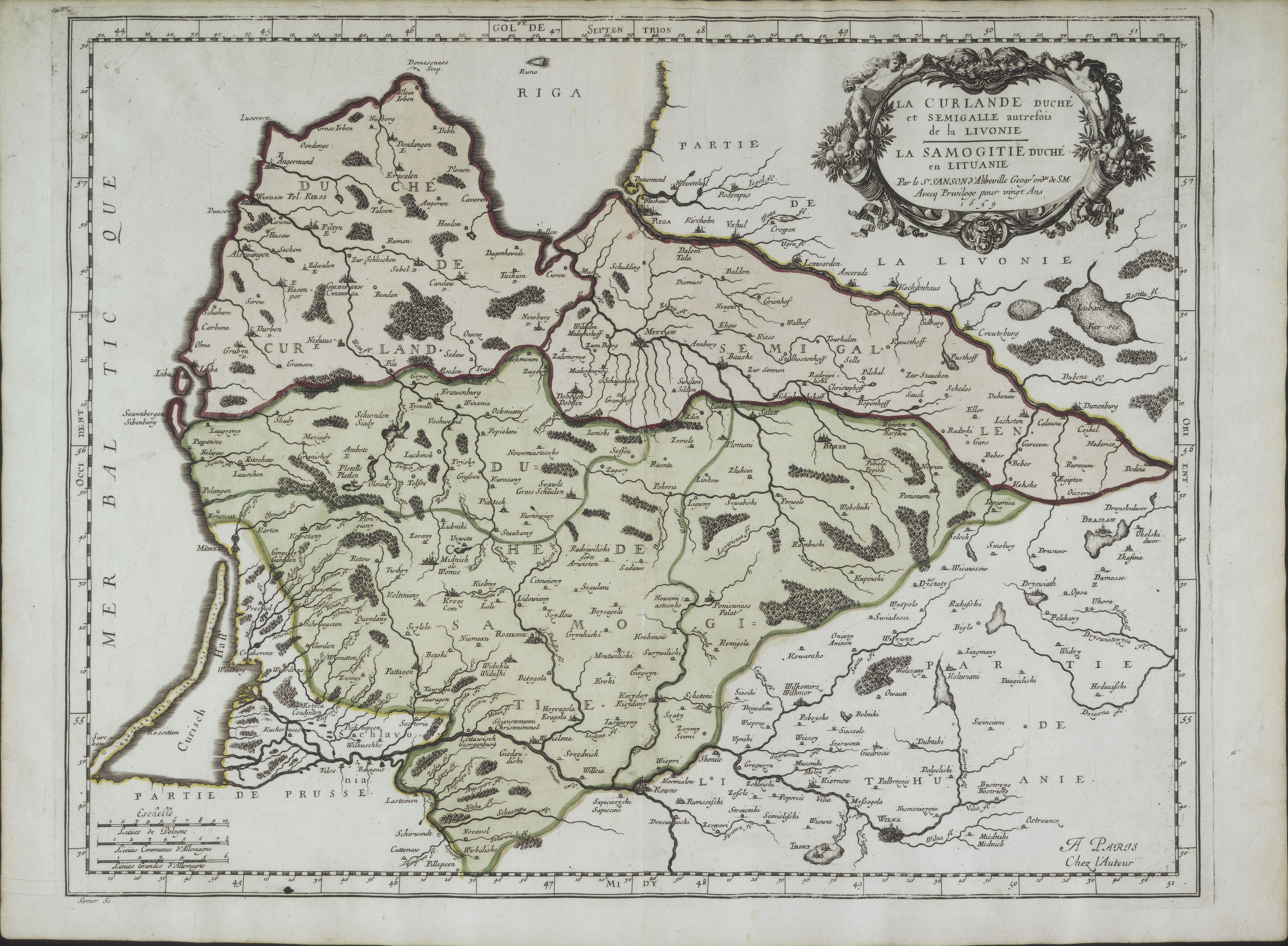
The Duchy of Courland and Semigallia and the Duchy of Samogitia in 1659

Danckwardt's detachment was later reinforced with 1,000 men, and fought several skirmishes against dispersed Russian and Lithuanian units after the battle, before rendezvousing with Lewenhaupt. The Swedish general had launched an offensive with 6,000 men from Joniškis on 8 February and planned to march through Raseiniai, where 5,000 Russian dragoons were stationed, to Ukmergė. From there he would be able to quickly march to the Daugava in case of a Russian attack against Riga, to prevent them from transporting siege equipment via the river. He reached Kelmė on February 11, where he remained until the 28th due to the lack of provisions. Reportedly, a few minor engagements against the Russians and Lithuanians were fought, in which the allies suffered significant losses. During his march towards Raseiniai, which was evacuated by the enemy, Lewenhaupt received alarming reports of Russian preparations to attack Riga which convinced him to cancel the offensive.

In June 1705, the Russians sent a force under Boris Sheremetev to invade Courland and cut Lewenhaupt off from Riga, to secure the rear before the confrontation against Charles XII. The two commanders met at the Battle of Gemauerthof, which ended in a Swedish victory; both Danckwardt and Budberg were killed in the battle. However, Lewenhaupt was later forced to withdraw to Riga before a subsequent invasion, leaving Courland open for Russian occupation. As a result of the major defeats at the Battle of Fraustadt and the Battle of Grodno the following year, the Russians were forced to evacuate Courland.

== Bibliography ==
- Faber, Samuel (1706). Der Ausführlichen Lebens-Beschreibung Carls des XII., Königs in Schweden: Volume 5 (in German). Nürnberg: Riegel. OCLC 61907196.
- Kort berättelse, om det fächtande som är förelupit den 3/13. februarij widh Polangen, emellan ett ifrån gref Leijonhufwudz armee, under herr major Danckwar ut- commenderat partie och ett starckt partie af ryszar och littouer, under den : ryska öfwerstens Iwan Stephan Gagoron Morbruns anförande (in Swedish). Stockholm: Kungliga Tryckeriet. 1705. OCLC 186788895.
- Lewenhaupt, Adam (1920–1921). Karl XII:s officerare. Biografiska anteckningar (in Swedish). Stockholm: P. A. Norstedt & Söners förlag. OCLC 15934571.
- Nordberg, Jöran; Heubel, Johann Heinrich (1745). Leben Karl des Zwölften Königs in Schweden mit Münzen und Kupfern: Volume 1 (in German). Hamburg: Trausold. OCLC 162299514.
- Post- och Inrikes Tidningar (1705). "Ordinarie Stockholmiske Post-Tijender: Af den 14 Martij" (in Swedish). Stockholm. OCLC 660060850.
- Uddgren, Hugo E. (1919). Karolinen Adam Ludvig Lewenhaupt hans krigföring i Kurland och Litauen 1703–1708: Volume 1 (in Swedish). Stockholm: A.B. Nordiska Bokhandeln. OCLC 891463792.
- Uddgren, Hugo E. (1950). Karolinen Adam Ludvig Lewenhaupt hans krigföring i Kurland och Litauen 1703–1708: Volume 2 (in Swedish). Uddevalla: Författarens Eget Förlag. OCLC 979134014.
