= Crimean campaign (1711) =

Crimean Campaign

- Part of Russo-Turkish War (1710–1713) and Great Northern War
Date	30 May – 24 July 1711
Location	Crimea
Result	Ottoman–Crimean victory

Belligerents
Ottoman Empire; Crimean Khanate	Tsardom of Russia; Cossack Hetmanate

Commanders and leaders
Devlet II Giray	Ivan Baturlin; Ivan Postelnikov (Cossack Hetmanate) Ivan Skoropadsky

Strength
30,000	7,178 Russians; 20,000 Cossacks

Casualties and losses
Unknown	Heavy

The Crimean campaign of 1711 was a joint Russian-Cossack campaign into Crimea during the Russo-Turkish War (1710–1713).

== Background ==
The Crimean campaign of 1711 was part of the Russo-Ottoman War of 1710–1711, which began due to the Great Northern War between Sweden and Russia. After Sweden's King Charles XII was defeated at Poltava in 1709, he took refuge in the Ottoman fortress of Bender. Ottoman Sultan Ahmed III refused Russian demands to expel him, leading Tsar Peter I to attack the Ottoman Empire, which declared war on Russia in November 1710. The Crimean Khanate, an Ottoman ally launched a series of raids as well as an unsuccessful campaign into Ukraine in early 1711. Following which, Hetman Skoropadsky along with General Ivan Baturlin set out on a campaign into Crimea.

== Campaign ==
On 30 May 1711, 7,000 Russian soldiers along with 20,000 Cossacks began an expedition into Crimea. They reached the Bohorodytska Fortress on 7 June. Devlet II Giray mobilized a force of 30,000 Tatars to counter the Russo-Cossack army. The Russians left a small garrison for communication and slowly advanced through the Dnieper rapids. Buturlin arrived in Kamenny Zaton on 2 July. He initially planned to send light Cossack detachments to Crimea via Syvash, but, as it turned out, this could not be done due to a shortage of light ships. A couple days later Buturlin received information about the main Tatar forces leaving Perekop. The movement of the Russian army was stopped. In the meantime, four battalions under the command of Captain Ivan Postelnikov, burned the Zaporizhian Sich, capturing four cannons. The Russo-Cossack force was in bad condition, with desertions and hunger running rampant. To make matters worse 15 thousand Tatars of Bakhti-Girey went to the rear of Buturlin and hung over Sloboda Ukraine, planning to strike Poltava. Hunger, desertion and fear of being cut off from their rear bases forced Buturlin and Skoropadsky to retreat hastily, without orders in late July.

== Aftermath ==
The campaign against Crimea failed and had no effect on the course of military operations. The Russo-Turkish War (1710–1713) ended in failure for Russia as well.
