= Rudolph Felix Bauer =

Baltic German general (1667–1717)

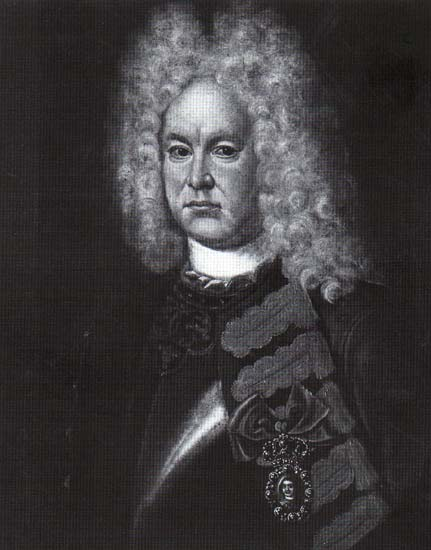
Rudolph Felix Bauer

Rudolph Felix Bauer (Russian: Рудольф Феликс Бауэр; 1667–1717) was a Baltic German cavalry general in Russian service.

== Career ==
He started his military career at the army of Duchy of Mecklenburg-Strelitz. Later he belonged to the Prussian Army. He participated in the Great Northern War on the Russian side.

== Sources ==
- "Баур, Родион Христианович" . Brockhaus and Efron Encyclopedic Dictionary (in Russian). 1906.
