= Expedition to Ösel (1711) =

Expedition to Ösel during the Great Northern War

- Part of the Great Northern War
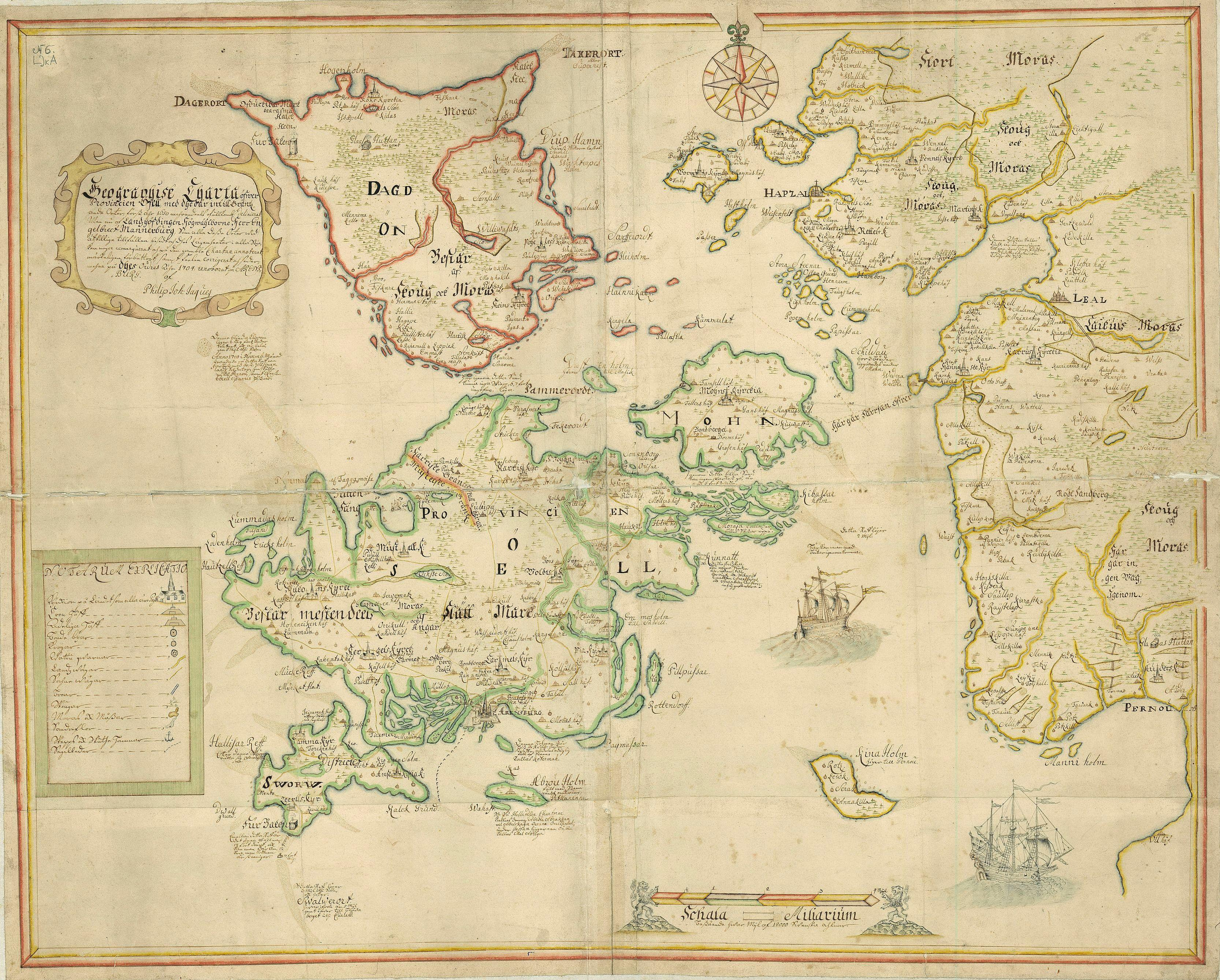
- Ösel and the surrounding area, 1704
Date	October – November 1711
Location	Saaremaa, Estonia
Result	Inconclusive

Belligerents
(yes) Swedish Empire	Tsardom of Russia

Commanders and leaders
(Swedish Empire) Carl Nieroth; (Swedish Empire) Otto Magnus Wolffelt	Not present

Strength
530 men	None present

The Swedish expedition to Ösel in 1711 took place during the Great Northern War, when a small detachment of Swedish troops under Colonel Otto Magnus Wolffelt attempted to conquer the island. The attempt was aborted due to a multitude of issues.

== Background ==
The defeat at Poltava, nearly a year prior, had effectively decided the course of the war, and by 1710, the fortresses in the Baltic provinces had all fallen to the Russians. It would take years to launch a renewed offensive, even after the reconstruction of forces. With Charles XII exiled in the Ottoman Empire, Swedish strategy in the latter half of the war mainly involved defending the remaining fortresses in the country.

The loss of the Baltic provinces could hardly be accepted, thus, the Swedish Council decided an attempt at retaking Ösel would be required at least for leverage in future peace negotiations.

== Planning ==
Since spring, planning had already begun. By 1 June, the Council instructed Carl Nieroth to prepare the reconquest of Reval and Ösel. Hans Henrik von Liewen, another commander involved in the planning, held the belief that Reval could be captured with a meagre 600 men. Otto Magnus Wolffelt was appointed in command of the expedition, but the plan for Reval was postponed due to strong Russian defenses and the limited amount of Swedish troops. Meanwhile, the preparations for the operation mainly consisted of the gathering of garrisons, weapons, and supplies. Scouting by Captain Otto Siöstierna determined the island was almost entirely undefended and thus open for reconquest. Most of the expeditionary force consisted of Major Gyllenström's battalion of some 180 and 305–320 men, remnants from Reval.

== Expedition ==
The expeditionary force of 530 men, including 443 privates and 87 officers and non-commissioned officers, finally embarked on the vessels at Helsinki on 30 September, but was forced to wait for favorable winds until 3 October. A strong storm on the night of 4 to 5 October scattered the ships, although the separated vessels were eventually found. After provisioning with additional supplies, the force sailed from Hangö Udd on 24 October, reaching anchor between Ösel and Wormsö the next day. Intelligence from a landing party on Wormsö determined no Russian troops were on the islands and that the garrison in Reval was weak. However, a severe storm from 25 October to 3 November damaged ships, and due to the constant bad weather, lack of provisions, and the troops' insufficient winter clothing, the Council of War aboard the frigate Wolgast decided on 30 October to abandon the attempt to reconquer Ösel. The expedition returned to Hangö Udd on 2 November, though many of the transports suffered damaged.

== Aftermath ==
In late November, Wolffelt reported to the Council that the expedition had failed. Following the failed expedition, the Swedish troops returned and wintered around Helsinki and Kyrkslätt. Charles XII would approve the idea of taking Ösel, but it was too late when he was informed of the expedition, while a new attempt planned for 1712 was canceled.
