= Jöran Nordberg =

Swedish historian

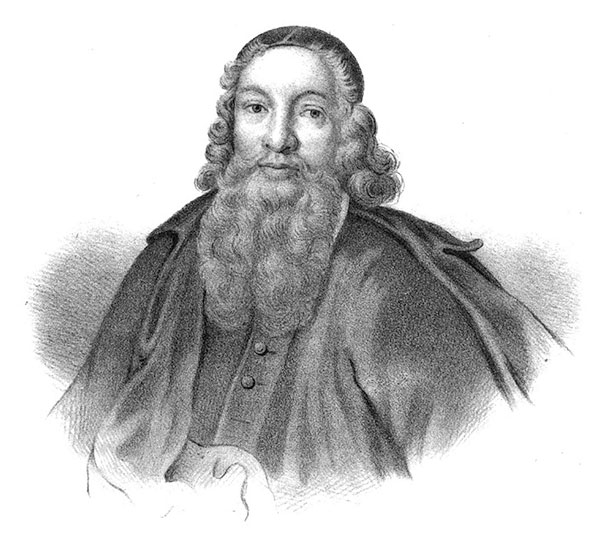
- Born: 3 September 1677
- Died: 24 March 1744 (aged 66)
- Education: Uppsala University
- Occupation: priest
- Writing career
- Genre: history
- Notable work: Konung Carl den XII:tes historia

Jöran Nordberg (1677–1744) was a Swedish priest and historian.

One of his most famous works is his biography of King Charles XII of Sweden, which was written in response to the perceived inaccuracies he found in Voltaire's popular biography of the king.

== Notable works ==
- Konung Carl den XII:tes historia.
