= Drabant Corps of Charles XII =

Swedish elite unit during the Great Northern War

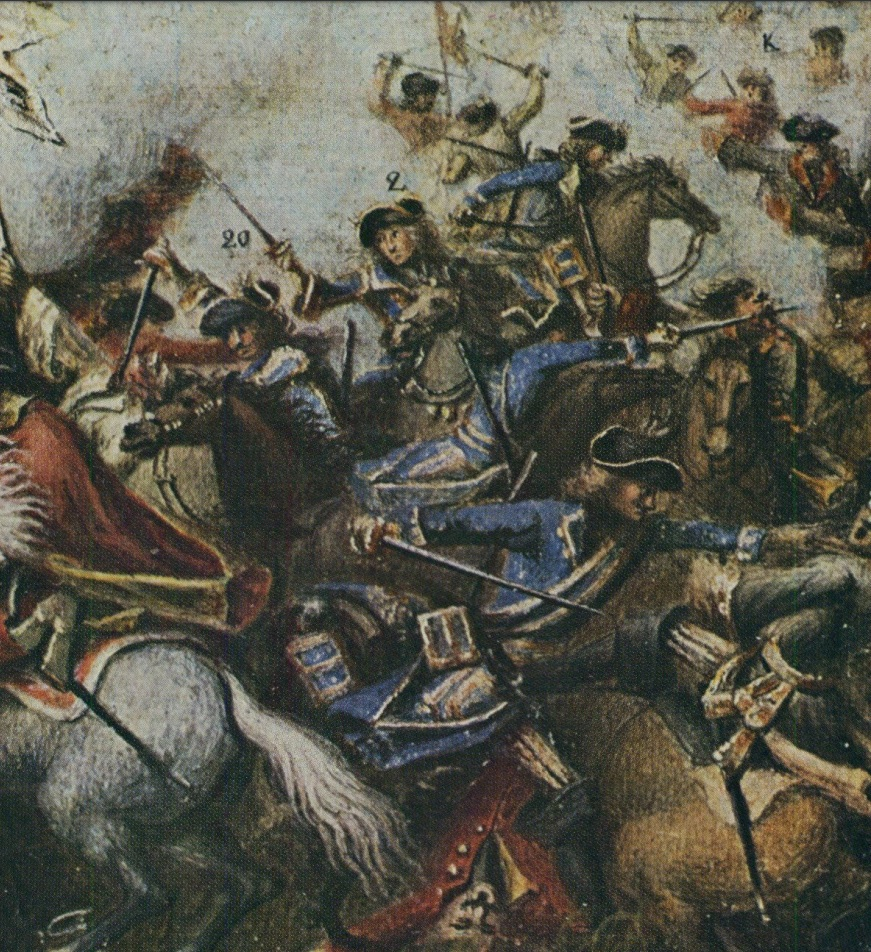
- Drabants fighting at the Düna – Johan Henrik Schildt
- Active: 1700–1718
- Country: Sweden
- Branch: Swedish Army
- Type: Cavalry; Royal guard
- Role: Bodyguard; Cavalry charges Cavalry tactics Cold-weather warfare Flanking maneuver Flying wedge Force protection Frontal assault Hand-to-hand combat Maneuver warfare Raiding; Reconnaissance; Screening; Shock tactics Tracking
- Size: 100–200 (168) (Note: While the corps had a nominal size of 200 common-Drabants (and 18 of higher ranks) ahead of the invasion of Denmark, this number was never achieved after the reforms of 1700; accordingly, the corps was formed into 12 corporalships, with a corporal and 12 common-Drabants in each one (as of 1702). As the Swedish army camped in Saxony, the nominal size was confirmed to be: One captain lieutenant, two lieutenants, one adjutant, one quartermaster, and 12 corporalships; in total, 150 common-Drabants and 18 men of higher ranks (including the commanding officer). Depending on circumstances, the strength for the corps shifted: Ahead of the invasion of Saxony in September 1706, the "full complement" of the corps was 100 common-Drabants (Adlerfelt); ahead of the invasion of Russia in October 1707, the size was 150 common-Drabants (Nordberg); following the return to Sweden proper in June 1716 until Charles XII was killed in November 1718, the corps never reached a strength above 50—all ranks included (von Schreeb).)
- Garrison/HQ: Östra och Västra boställshuset
- Colours: None
- Engagements: Great Northern War; Narva (1700); Düna (1701); Kliszów (1702); Pułtusk (1703); Thorn (1703); Lemberg (1704); Tillendorf (1704); Grodno (1706); Byerazino (1708); Holowczyn (1708); Rajovka (1708); Opishnia (1709); Khukhra (1709); Gorodnoye (1709); Poltava (1709); Bender (1713); Stresow (1715); Stralsund (1715)

Commanders
- Notable commanders: Captain: Charles XII †; Captain lieutenants: Arvid Horn (1696–1705); Carl Wrangel (1706–1707); Otto Wrangel † (1707–1708); Gustaf Hård (1710–1717); Johan Giertta (1717–1722)

The Drabant Corps of Charles XII (Swedish: Karl XII:s Drabantkår) was the most prestigious cavalry king's guard unit in the Swedish Army during the time of the Great Northern War that specialized in cold-weather warfare, escort King Charles XII of Sweden, flanking maneuver, flying wedge formations, frontal assault, hand-to-hand combat, maneuver warfare, raiding with cavalry tactics, and screening.

As a result of the reforms of 1700, all personnel in the corps received an officer's rank with increased wages, while its size was eventually set at 168 men. Those serving as Drabants were almost exclusively recruited from the Swedish Empire, with most coming from Sweden. The corps was issued the finest weapons, horses, and clothing was often adorned with gold lacing. They fought according to the cavalry regulations of the Caroleans, emphasizing the cold-steel charge in slight wedge formations, knee behind knee, over the more common caracole. This strategy allowed them to function as a bodyguard for the king as well as an elite combat unit, often playing a crucial role in the battles despite their relatively small size.

During the war, the corps frequently marched with the main army and the king, fighting in most battles.

The Drabants took part in the Landing at Humlebæk against Denmark in 1700, but did not see action. They were sent to Swedish Livonia and Estonia later the same year along with the main army, and won a decisive victory at Narva over the Russians. They took part in the Crossing of the Düna and were instrumental to the Swedish success in the battle over the Saxons. The victory was followed by the Swedish invasion of the Polish–Lithuanian Commonwealth, resulting in the successful Battle of Kliszów in 1702, where the Drabants fought in the cavalry engagement on the right flank. The Drabants, along with the king's army, then dealt two blows to Augustus II's cavalry and infantry in the engagements at Pułtusk and Thorn, respectively. In 1704, the corps took part in the Storming of Lemberg and, as the Saxons were chased out of Poland, the annihilation of a Russian force at Tillendorf. After quartering at Rawicz, the Drabants skirmished near Grodno in 1706, as Charles XII was starving the Russians out. They followed their king during the invasion of Saxony, where Augustus was defeated.

The following year, Charles XII launched a campaign against Russia, his last enemy; the Drabants saw action at Byerazino in 1708, after which they fought at the Battle of Holowczyn, losing their captain lieutenant and many others. Afterward, they saved their king at the Battle of Rajovka. They were active in Charles' February offensive early the next year, which ended in the struggle at Gorodnoye, after Opishnia and Khukhra. While besieging Poltava, the campaign culminated in the ensuing battle and following surrender, forcing the king to flee to the Ottoman Empire with his Drabants. After a stay there, the Drabants fought at Bender in 1713, where they were captured. After they were released, they marched towards Swedish Pomerania the following year. Along with their king the dwindled corps fought in the defense of Stralsund and the Battle of Stresow in 1715, before reaching Sweden proper the next year. The remaining Drabants were merged with the newly raised Life Squadron. The formation took part in the invasion of Norway in 1718, which ended abruptly with Charles XII death in Siege of Fredriksten. The Drabants then remained mostly idle until peace was finally secured.

== Background ==
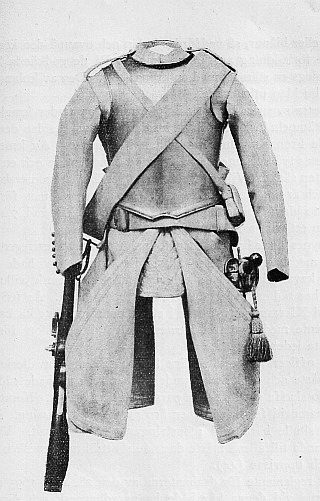
Drabant outfit issued in 1695

In 1523, following the Swedish War of Liberation, the Drabant corps was created out of the bodyguards who had accompanied Gustav I during the war. The small corps functioned solely as palace guards until the reign of Charles IX in the early 1600s, when it became a combat unit. Due to its small size, the corps was later incorporated into the King's Life and Court Regiment (the Yellow Brigade) by Gustavus Adolphus, as the foremost company. Following the death of her father at the Battle of Lützen, Christina created an independent company (Compagnie de Guardia) out of the surviving Drabants, who again served as palace guards. In 1654, a noble-company in the King's regiment, which had been raised the previous year, seized the role as a Drabant corps meant for combat.

After the coronation of Charles X, the King's regiment was reorganized into both infantry and cavalry, with the name Royal Majesty's Life Guards of Horse and Foot. The Drabant noble company (Guardie de Corpus) served as the only cavalry, until 1657 when two Horse Guard companies were incorporated. After Charles' death in 1660, the Drabant company—still cavalry—was incorporated into the Life company infantry of that regiment - the remaining cavalry companies were disbanded the following year. On the eve of the Danish invasion of Scania in 1675, Charles XI reorganized the Life Regiment into a formation similar to that of his father, with one company of cavalry (Royal Majesty's Drabants), with its core composed of the Drabants, now separated from the infantry. The company, alongside its regiment, participated in the war's well-known battles. On 28 July 1700 (18 July according to the Swedish calendar), less than three years after his coronation, Charles XII reformed the Drabant company. The Royal regiment became known as the Royal Majesty's Life Guards of Foot, while the Drabants were made into an independent corps under the king's personal command.

== Organization ==
According to the regulations of 1695, the nominal size of the Drabant company was 200 privates, 4 officers, and 8 non-commissioned officers, (Note: Officers: One lieutenant colonel, one captain lieutenant, and two lieutenants; NCOs: One quartermaster, one adjutant, and six corporals.) formed into six corporalships (a body of soldiers under a corporal's command).

The Drabant corps was initially garrisoned in Arboga (four corporalships) and Köping (two), until 1700, when a Drabant residence was built in Stockholm (today's Östra och Västra boställshuset). The residence remained empty of Drabants because of the campaigns of the Great Northern War. While 25 Drabants remained on guard-duty with the king whenever he resided in Stockholm, the corps was a strict combat unit. Unlike the provincial regiments, which were often allotted, the Drabant corps was värvat (enlisted).

=== Reforms ===
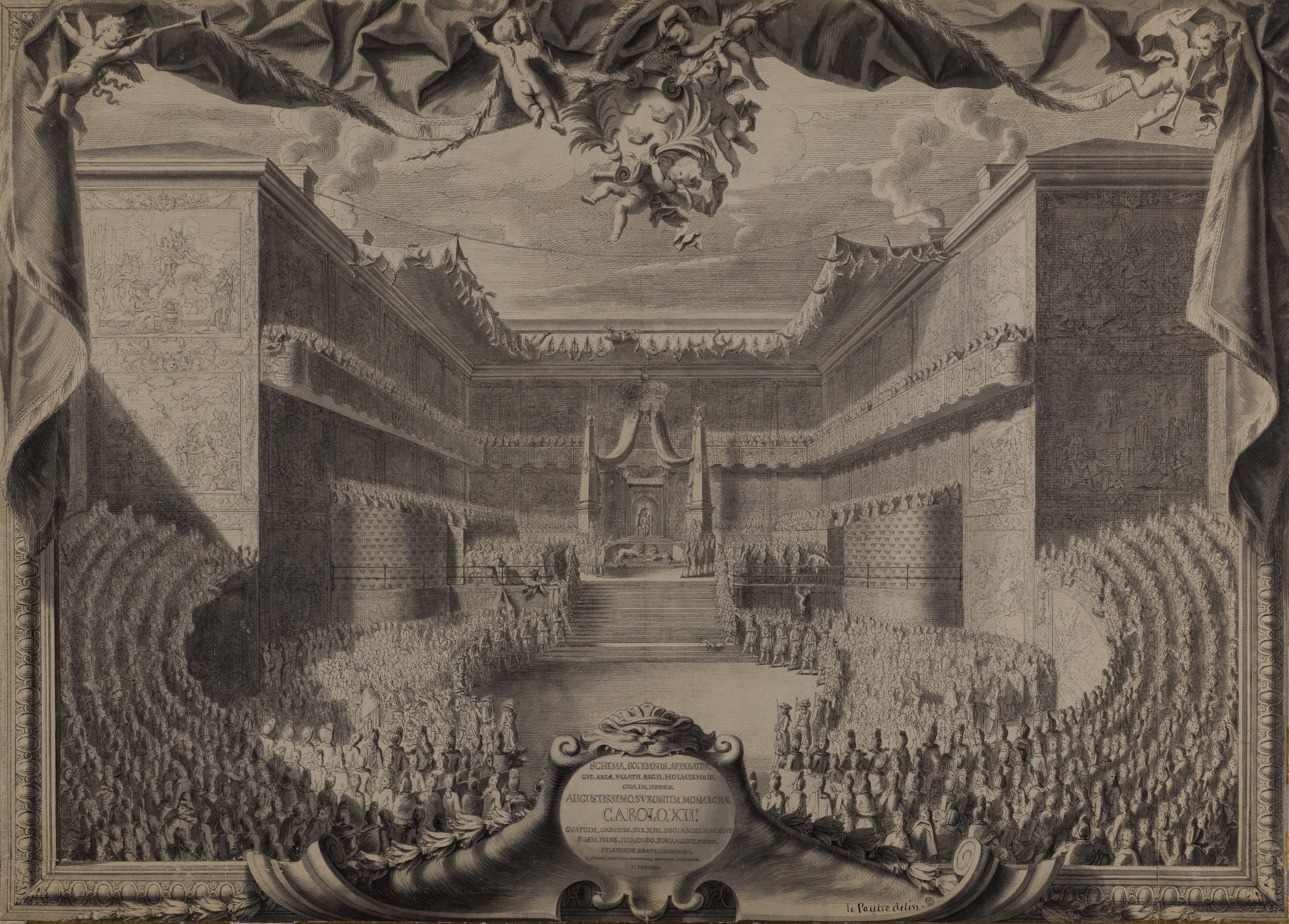
Charles XII's ceremony on 23 December 1697, with the Drabants standing guard

On 1 January 1700, Charles XII replaced 42 elderly Drabants with younger lieutenants, second lieutenants, cornets, NCOs and privates from other regiments. (Note: Of the 43 newly recruited Drabants, one had been a captain lieutenant, 14 lieutenants, 13 second lieutenants or cornets, and 15 NCOs or privates. Many of the dismissed Drabants became palace guards for the princess—and future queen—Ulrika Eleonora of Sweden.) On 28 July, he made himself the commanding officer (entitled captain) over the corps, while the previous lieutenant colonel, Carl Nieroth, became the commanding officer of another regiment. The second-in-command (entitled captain lieutenant), Arvid Horn, was promoted to major general over the cavalry. An additional 53 Drabants were dismissed on 18 September, while the six vice-corporals were promoted to corporals. The actual size became one commanding officer, one captain lieutenant, two lieutenants, one quartermaster, one adjutant, and 12 corporalships (each with one corporal and 12 common-Drabants); in total, 150 common-Drabants and 18 men of higher ranks (including Charles XII). The corps had no military colours or standards. Until 1716, the corps' official name was: "Kongl. Maij:tz Drabanter" (Royal Majesty's Drabants); it was also frequently called the "Guarde de Corps till häst" (Guard Corps of Horse), and less frequently the "Lif-Drabante-Corpsen" (Life Drabant Corps).

On 17 February 1702, the corporalships began to take turns guarding the king at the headquarters, with at least four Drabants guarding him at all times. The corps normally camped next to and marched with Charles XII. On 29 November 1706, vice-corporals were reintroduced, with a rank next to that of a captain in the Life Guards of Foot. In 1716, after years of campaigning and insufficient recruits, the corps became too small to act independently. For this reason, Charles created a Life Squadron (360 men, excluding officers and NCOs) that he placed under the command of the Drabants; its official name was "Kongl. Maij:tz Drabanter och Lif-Escadron" (Royal Majesty's Drabants and Life Squadron), or the "Kongl. Maij:tz Lif-Guardie till häst" (Royal Majesty's Life Guard of Horse).

=== Ranks and wages ===
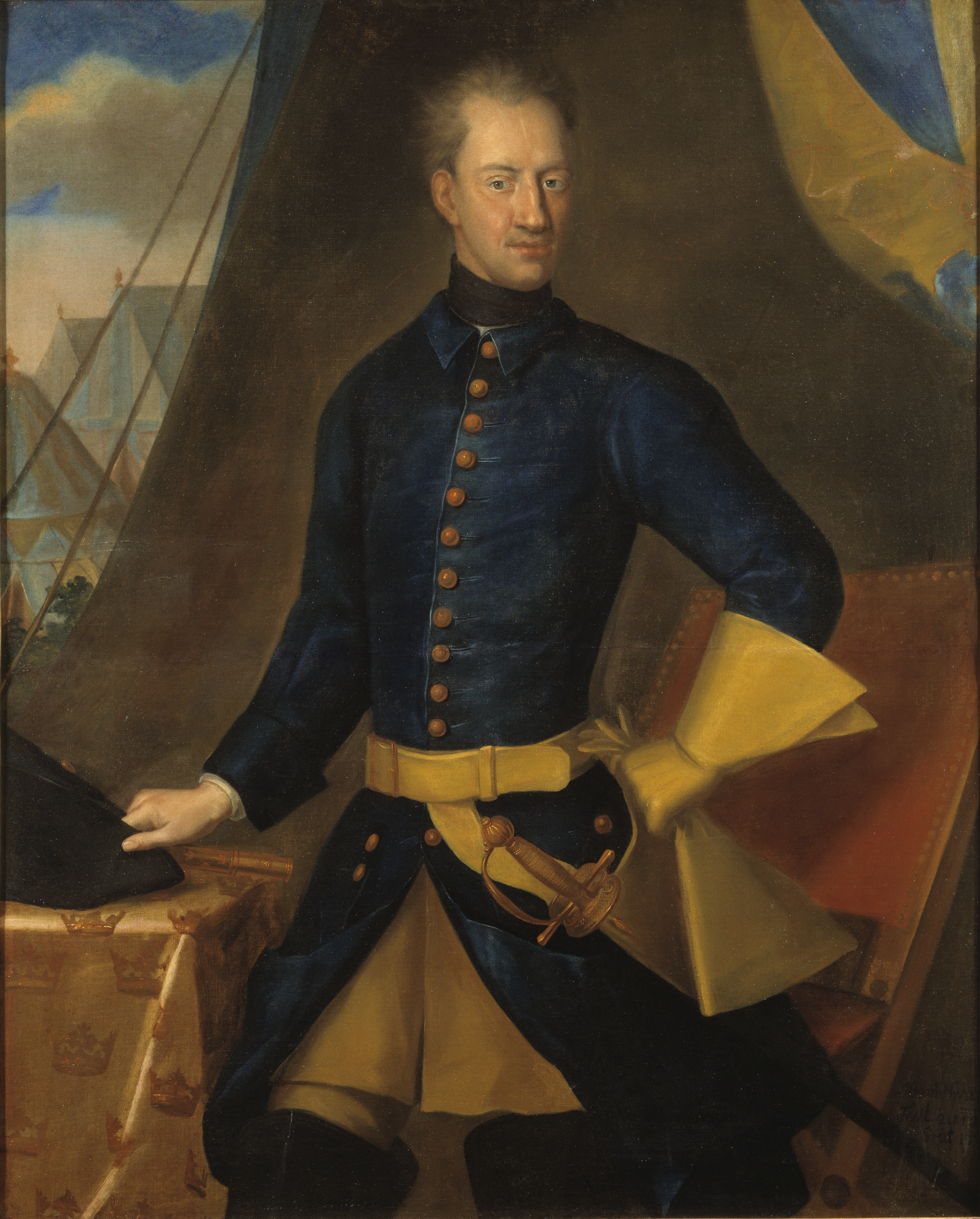
Charles XII in Altranstädt, in 1706

All Drabants had an officer ranking: The rank of the captain lieutenant was made equal to that of a major general, admiral or Landshövding (governor); the Drabant-lieutenants had a rank comparable to a colonel; the Drabant-corporals had a rank next to a major; the adjutant and quartermaster had a rank equal to that of a lieutenant colonel; the commoners had a rank similar to that of a ryttmästare (captain) in the Life Regiment of Horse, or a captain in the Life Regiment Dragoons. Evidently, only the officers from other regiments could be commended to the corps, as long as they were experienced, capable and brave. These changes made the corps "unlike anything else seen in Europe", according to Jöran Nordberg.

As per the reforms of 1700, monthly wages increased by three times or more times. The wage for a common-Drabant, which amounted to 41 copper dollars and 20 öre (almost 14 silver dollars) in 1697, was increased to 60 silver dollars; the captain lieutenant received 400 silver dollars; the two lieutenants received 300 each; the adjutant and quartermaster received 100 each; the 12 corporals received 80 each. However, the ranks below lieutenants now had to pay for their own accouterment, unlike before. Excluding non-combatants, the monthly cost for 200 commoners and 17 Drabants of higher ranks amounted to 14,160 silver dollars, or 169,920 for a whole year; the cost was 11,160 and 133,920 respectively for 150 commoners and 17 Drabants of higher ranks—which de facto became the nominal size.

=== Personnel ===
While the nobility of Sweden and Livonia was strongly represented in the corps, it did not dominate it. From the time when Charles XII seized the command in 1700 until his death in 1718, about 380 men served as Drabants, all coming from different positions and ranks; 150 came from the earlier Drabant-company, of whom 53 were retired already in September 1700 as previously noted. Apart from these, 64 ryttmästare and captains, 14 captain lieutenants or quartermasters, 92 lieutenants, 17-second lieutenants or cornetts, and 19 NCOs or privates are known to have been recruited.

Almost every Swedish regiment had to release their bravest and most capable soldiers: 19 came from the Life Guards of Foot; 12 from the Life Regiment of horse; 12 came from the Uppland Regiment; 5 came from the Swedish Navy; between one and seven came from the remaining regiments (from within the borders of present-day Sweden). 21 men came from Finland, 40 from Swedish Estonia, Swedish Ingria, Swedish Livonia or Swedish Pomerania, while 12 came from foreign service. They were largely recruited from within the borders of the Swedish Empire. Charles XII enforced strict discipline, such that the harmony in the corps was not always perfect. Several Drabants died or were dismissed for dueling, or participating in a duel. Others were punished for serious quarrels, even during service. In 1703, two Drabants were court-martialed and sentenced to death for having "engaged in a brawl and exposed their swords during the picket guard" (they were, however, subsequently pardoned to life by the king).

=== Tactics ===
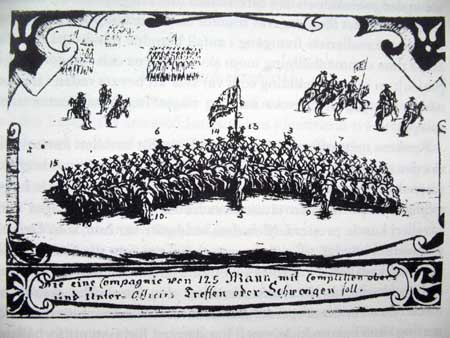
Swedish cavalry wedge formation according to the regulations of 1707

At the outbreak of the war, the Drabants fought according to the Swedish cavalry regulation of 1685; contrary to most of Europe, it emphasized a pistol volley followed by the cold-steel charge over the use of caracole (even though it was still employed). The squadron advanced at a trot and then, when approaching the enemy at a distance of 200–300 steps, sped to full gallop. Pistols were fired at 50–75 steps, after which the squadron promptly struck the enemy in melee. Following a successful charge, the squadron reestablished order and prepared second pistols before pursuing the enemy squadron. If the initial charge failed, the squadron instead withdrew behind its reserves to prepare for a new engagement. The tactical unit of the Swedish cavalry was the squadron, which consisted of two companies; the riders were formed up in three ranks, or sometimes two.

After early combat experiences, the usage of pistols during the charge ended as the momentum and formation were more emphasized. Instead of firing a pistol volley, the squadron now charged sword in hand at full gallop. Instead of forming up in straight lines, the cavalry formed up in slight wedge formations, knee behind knee. The men in the left-wing set their right knees locked into the kneepits of the comrades obliquely in front of them to the right; the same principle—but opposite leg—was true for the men positioned in the right-wing. Following a successful charge, the outer wings of the squadron immediately pursued, while the center followed behind in an orderly gallop, ready to intervene against enemy reserves. With these changes, Charles XII created the most effective cavalry of the day— the Drabants were seen charging with only sword in hand by the time of the Battle of Düna. The Drabants could temporarily assume command over other units, but the corps was not a strict predecessor to the general staff. Despite its small size, the corps held prominent roles in battles and was often instrumental to Sweden's success; it usually functioned similarly to shock troops, to penetrate and create openings in the enemy lines for friendly units to exploit. It was equipped with the finest available weapons, horses and equipment, and was well-drilled, often by Charles XII personally.

== Armament ==
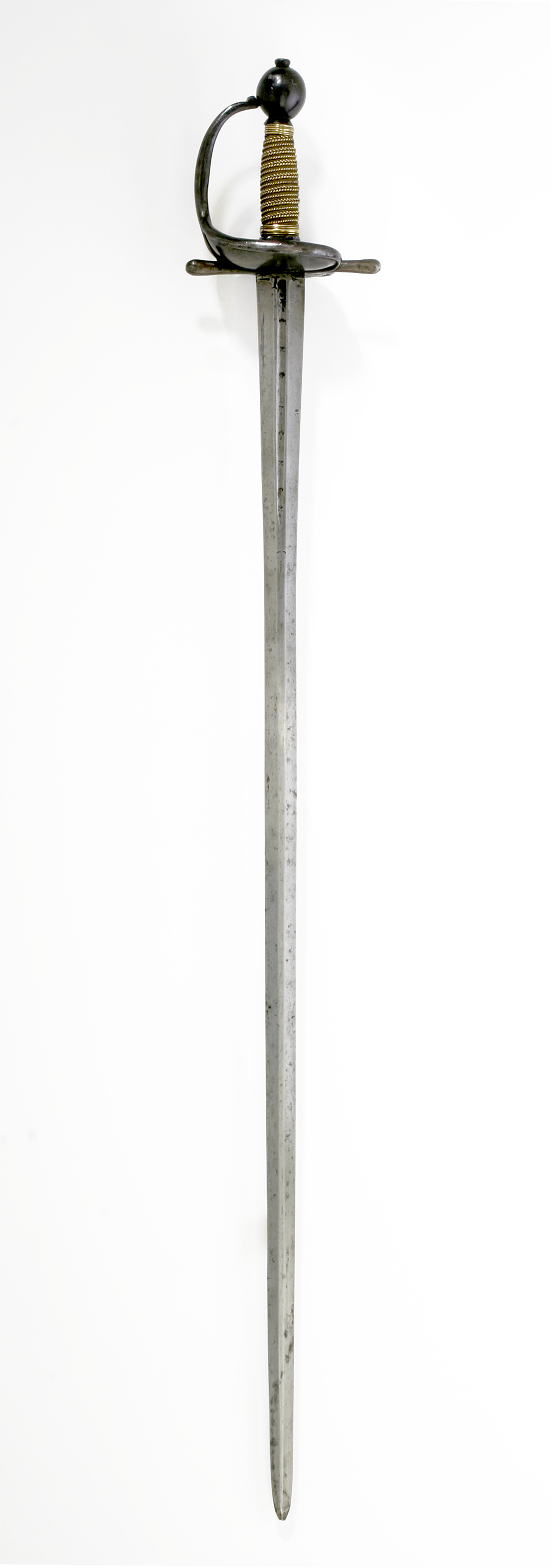
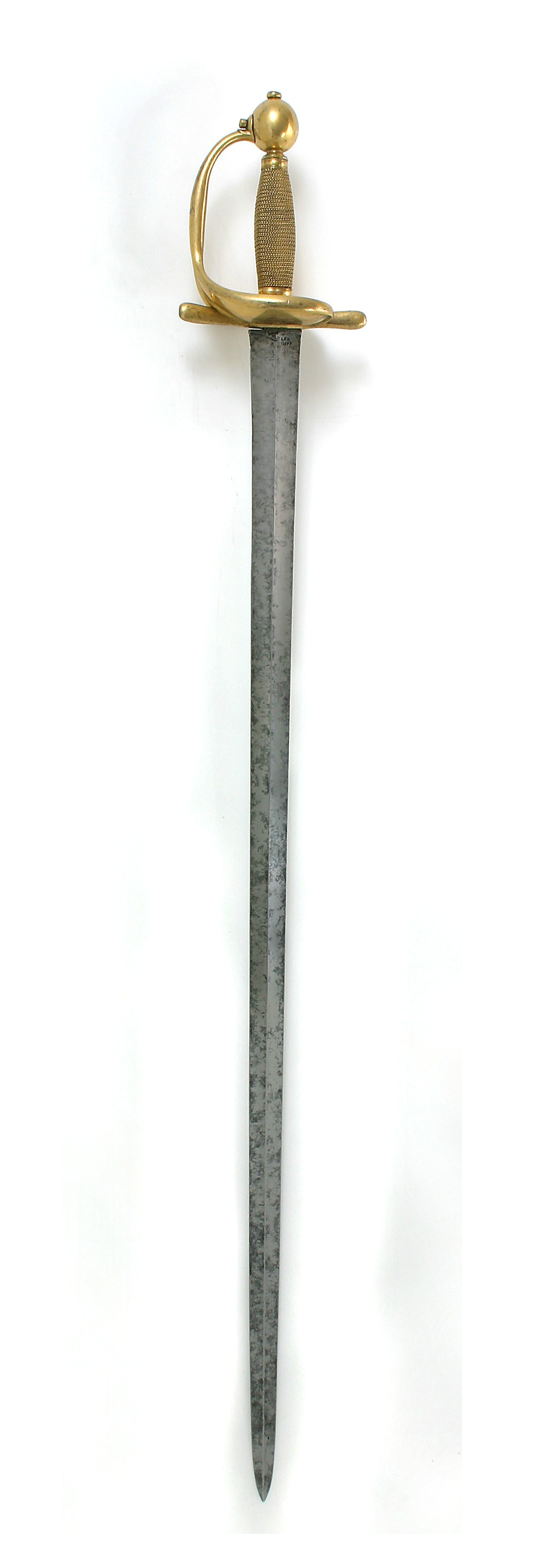
Drabant sword model 1693 (left); Drabant sword model 1701 (right)

The Drabants' weapons were similar to those of the other cavalry regiments; a sword, a carbine, and a pair of pistols. The Drabant sword and carbine, in particular, were among the finest weapons available at the time. In 1937, Swedish fencer Nils Hellsten, commented that: "such an excellent sword, equally capable of both thrusting and slashing, has not existed in any army for the past 200 years".

=== Sword ===
From 1700 to 1703, the Drabants used a 112 cm sword of model 1693 (m/1693), with a 95 cm long double-edged straight blade, with fullers; the width of the blade was 3,7 cm at the hilt, and 2,4 cm half a meter out from the hilt. The common-Drabants had hilts made of polished blue tempered wrought iron, with the grip wrapped in gilded brass wire; the ranks above them presumably had gilded brass hilts and wire.

In 1701, Charles XII ordered a new set of swords for his Drabants, to be made with the "finest goods possible"; they arrived in late 1703, during the campaign in Poland, costing 14 and a 1/3 silver dollar for each. The m/1701 was about 121,5 cm long (103,9 cm long blade) and weighed around 1,7 kg; the width of the blade was at least 4,1 cm at the hilt, 3,1 cm half a metre out and 0,8 cm near the point. (Note: On 21 February 1701, Charles XII placed an order for 200 new Drabant-swords (and 100 additional blades) according to the "Saxon manner", with a requested blade-length of 98,97 cm, and a width of 4,95 cm (at the hilt) to 2,47 cm (near the point). The manufacturer received the order with some confusion, as such proportions were seen as remarkably wide and heavy. For this reason, two different prototypes were sent back to Charles XII before entering mass production; one of them [the recommended one] being narrower but slightly longer than what was initially requested. After having tested both prototypes, Charles XII replied on 27 May 1701, deciding upon the longer variant. The exact specifications for the m/1701—which was seen as being unusually large—have not been identified; however, the blade for the later m/1717, which was "efter wahnlige Drabante modellen giorde" (made in lines with the previous Drabant models), was 103,9 cm long, and at least 4 cm wide (at the hilt), with a weight of around 1,7 kg, including the hilt.) It offered no blood grooves and all hilts were made of gilded brass. New swords were ordered in 1711 and 1717, with a similar appearance to that of the m/1701.

In 1716, the ranks above the common-Drabants received new hilts. The sword had a ribbon of yellow and blue silk (possibly adorned with gold). The scabbard was made of hardwood covered in chamois leather (moose), and was attached to a waist belt made of blue velvet for the lieutenants (including captain lieutenant), and jagg (a simpler form of velvet) for the ranks below.

=== Carbine and pistols ===
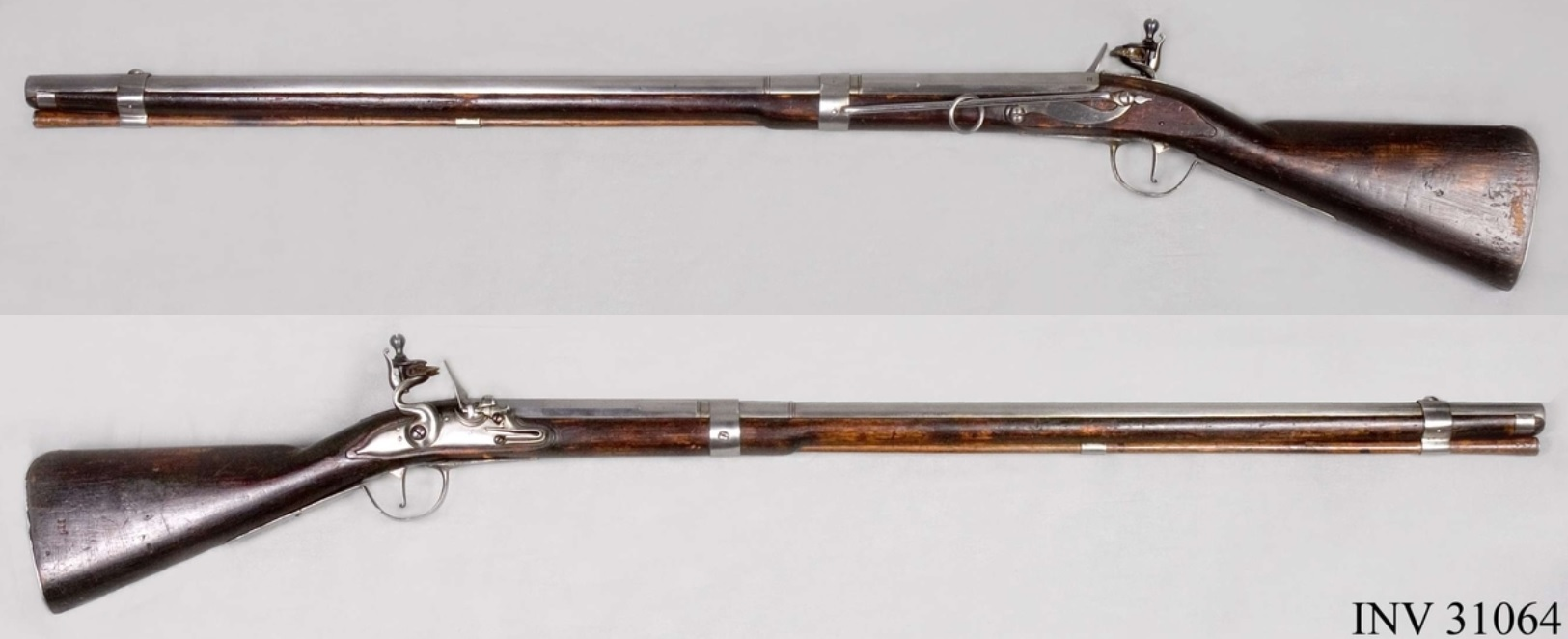
Drabant carbine model 1699

At the outbreak of the war, the Drabants were armed with a pair of pistols and a foreign flintlock carbine that was at least 15 years old. In 1703, a new set of Swedish-produced Drabant carbines arrived along with the new swords, using a French flintlock mechanism; m/1699 was 120,5 cm long and weighed 3,28 kg, it had a 86,5 cm long smoothbore barrel with a calibre of 19 mm. In contrast to many other Swedish firearms, it came with a reversible frizzen, as an extra safety measurement during transport. The new carbine-model, which had an effective range of approximately 30–35 m, cost at least 7 1/3 silver dollars and would be used thereafter. The carbine was secured by an iron hook, attached to the carbine belt.

Some uncertainty remains regarding which pistols the Drabants used—whether they were equipped with common cavalry pistols or one specially designed for them; it is possible that they used a pair of matchlock pistols until they were equipped with two flintlock cavalry pistols of model 1699 (if the Drabants used a specially designed model. The main differences were quality and price, while the specifications remained mostly the same); it was 54 cm long, of which the smoothbore barrel was 35,8 cm with a caliber of 15,7 mm, and weighted 1,35 kg. The pistol had an effective range of approximately 10 m, and the cost for a pair was 7 silver dollars. Pistol m/1699 was later replaced by m/1704, which had similar specifications. In 1717, the Drabants were most likely equipped with a new pistol; the m/1717 was 54 cm long (the barrel was 35,6 cm), with a caliber of 16,3 mm and a weight of 1,64 kg—the pistol was of high quality, with a stock made of brown-stained birch, and brass fittings. The leather holster for the pistols was attached to the bridle or saddle. Lieutenants were also provided with certain regimental rifles, or muskets, carried by their servants.

== Appearance ==
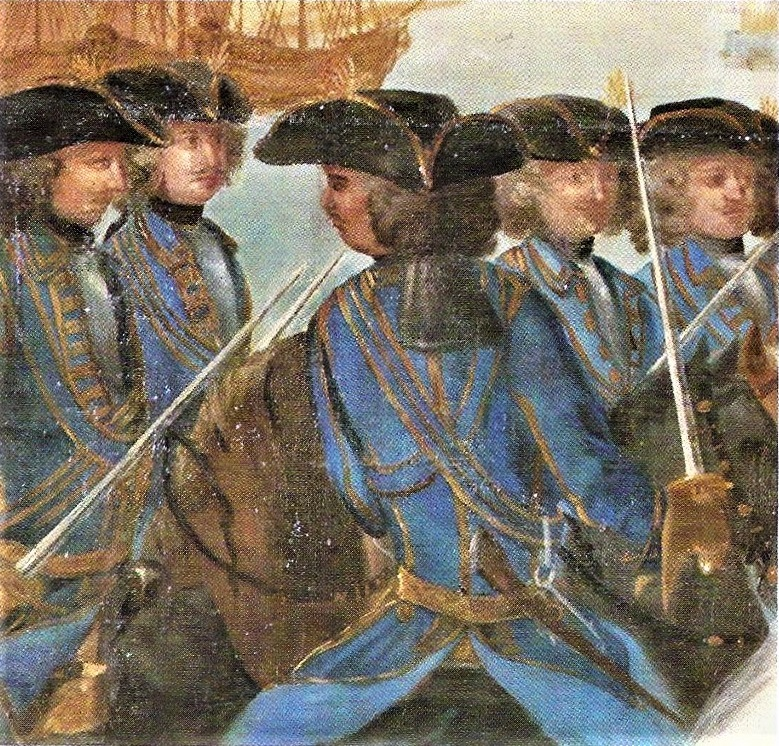
Uniforms of the Drabants in 1701, at the Crossing of the Düna

In the beginning of 1700, the Drabants received lavish new uniforms, replacing the older skin sweaters and pants, as well as the blue cloth coats. The cloak was not replaced. In total, the price for the new uniforms, accessories, shabracks, and holster caps—which were all adorned with golden laces, gallons, and lashes—cost 56,000 silver daler, roughly the same amount required to equip four cavalry regiments (1,000 men each) with pistols and carbines. As stated in 1942, the Drabant outfit of 1700 outshines everything else the Swedish army has ever issued.

=== Uniform ===
The common Drabants appearance was a black tricorne hat (the hair was often pulled into a hair pouch or tucked under the hat) with a band, button, and snag, which was edged with 2,5 [Swedish] ells (≈148,5 cm) of gold lacing (galloon)—the Drabants also frequently carried wigs; black scarf of a length of 1 ell (≈59,4 cm); blue cloth coat with a lining of light blue rask (textile), which was tight around the groin and loose at the bottom, with tucked-up tails and arm cuffs. It was adorned with 20,5 ells (≈12,17 m) of gold lacing, and 17,5 ells (≈10,39 m) long layer of gold, over and under the holes for the gilded brass buttons; mid-thigh long camisole (leather vest), adorned with 8 ells (≈4,75 m) of gold lacing and 13,5 ells (≈8 m) of gold across the buttonholes; skin pants that were tight around the knees, with no gold-lacing (only the lieutenants had adorned pants); stiff jackboots with broad cuffs, and polished black spurs with leather; blue cloth-cloak with a lining of boj (textile), rounded blue-collar, and gilded buckles; long gloves with thick collars made out of moose-leather and grips of buckskin, adorned with 2,5 ells (≈148,5 cm) of gold lacing. Uniform-luxury increased with rank: The lacing for the common-Drabants weighted 39 [Swedish] lod (≈0,55 kg); the ranks between the common-Drabants and lieutenants carried 112–132 lod (1,5–1,8 kg), while the lieutenants carried even more (depending on individual).

As the Swedish army camped in Saxony in 1706–1707, foreign visitors reportedly claimed that they had never before seen such fine and warlike troops, referring to the Drabants. In 1717, back in Sweden after many campaigns, the Drabants again received new uniforms: the hats were adorned with 11 [Swedish] quarters (163 cm) of gold lacing and had a button similar to the ones in the coat; the coat had 28 gilded buttons while the camisole had 31 smaller buttons; the collars of the gloves, which no longer had any gold lacing, were made of thick oxhide while the grip was still made with buckskin; the waist belts were now also made without any gold lacing.

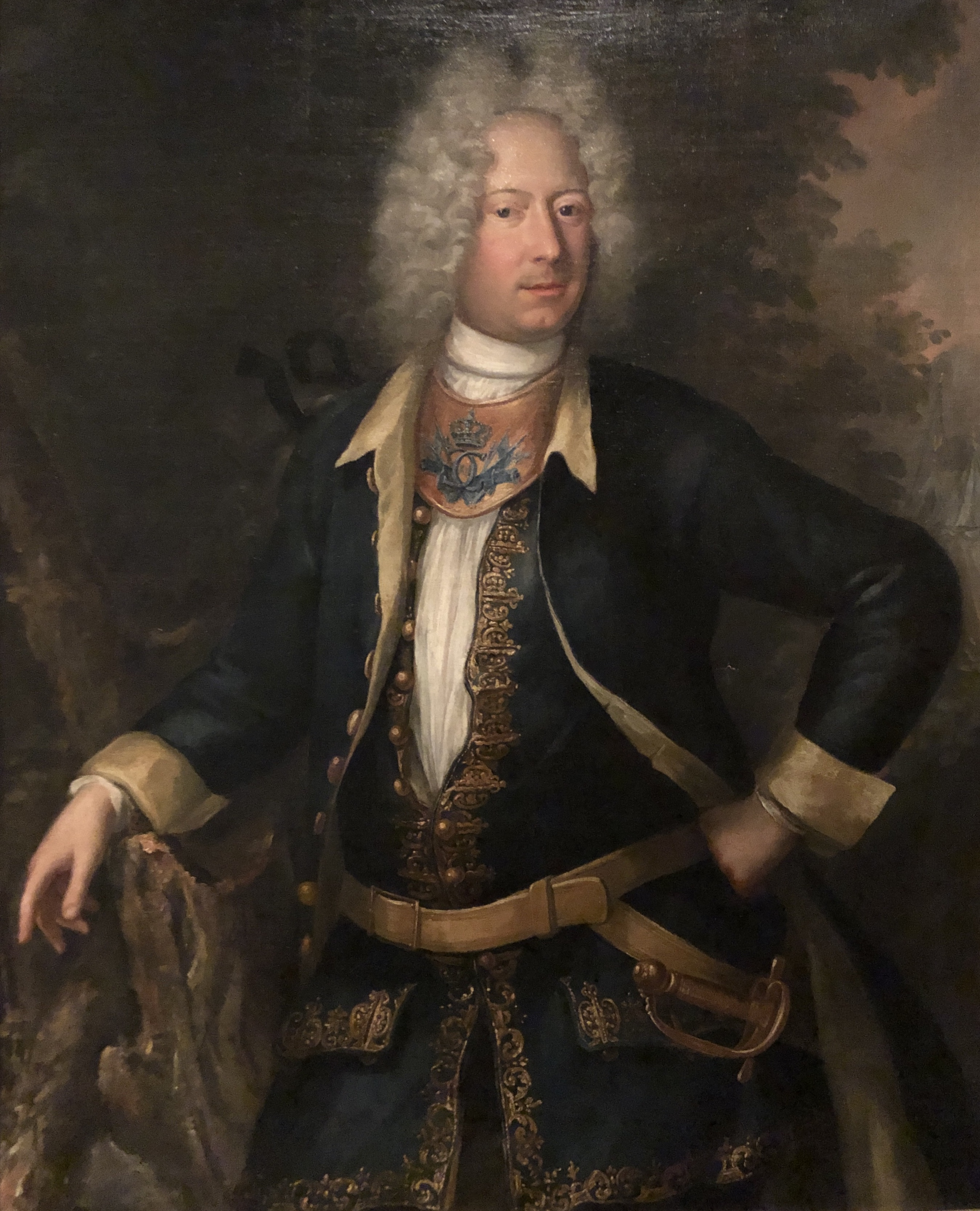
Captain lieutenant Arvid Horn, wearing his Drabant-officer uniform and gorget

=== Armour and accessories ===
As was standard for the Swedish cavalry, the common-Drabants entered the war with breastplates that were thick enough to sustain musket shots, while the lieutenants also had back pieces that could sustain pistol shots. In 1701, Charles XII ordered 200 cuirasses for his common-Drabants, which would protect from both musket shots to the front and carbine shots to the back (better than the lieutenants); the cuirasses were thoroughly tested. The cost for one cuirass was 20 silver dollars, and 4,000 silver dollars for the complete set. In addition to the cuirass, the lieutenants also carried gorgets with the royal cypher of Charles XII.

The waist belt for the sword was 6 cm wide and was made out of chamois leather (moose), adorned with blue jagg and 7,75 ells (≈4,6 m) of gold lacing; the carbine belt (worn over the left shoulder) was 10 cm wide and was made with chamois leather (moose), adorned with blue jagg and 8,25 ells (≈4,9 m) of gold lacing; the patron belt (worn over the right shoulder) was at least 3,5 cm wide and the frame was of iron-sheet, adorned with blue jagg and 2,75 ells (≈163 cm) of gold lacing. In total, the common-Drabants carried gold-lacing to a weight of 74 lod (≈1 kg), the lieutenants carried 223–320 lod (3,1–4,5 kg), while the ranks in-between carried 158–197 lod (2,1–2,7 kg). Furthermore, the Drabants were equipped with personal clothing, such as extra shoes, socks, shirts, and pants, etc.

=== Horses ===
The Drabants used the army's best horses, all of which were carefully examined, both mentally and physically, and often bought abroad. The specifications for such a purchase was: between 5–7 years of age; no lower than nine quarters and a half (141 cm) and no higher than 10 quarters (148,5 cm)—measured from behind the saddle; strong and healthy legs with no flat-footed hooves; thick and broad chest and croup; no white, pale-red, or matte colors. In 1697, a purchase of 20 horses in Denmark cost up to 1,300 riksdaler species (2,600 silver dollars). By 1700, the price for horses was increasing significantly. Certain stud farms had been established in Strömsholm, Kungsör and Läckö, where stallions and mares were imported from Norway, Livonia, Pomerania and France, for breeding purposes; the horses were primarily issued to the two elite cavalry regiments, the Life Regiment of Horse and the Drabants.

At the outbreak of the Great Northern War, the Drabants were probably still using saddles, pistol-holsters, and stirrups from 1695—which most likely resembled the appearance of saddles bought in 1717. Simple saddlery and cover (preferably of English leather, otherwise, polished with a double-layer of brass, with clutch belt); no breastplate (tack); pistol-holster of simple leather; halter of iron rings, with a well-grinded coupling hook; bridle and stirrups with gilded fittings and buckles. In 1700, the Drabants received new shabracks and caps for the pistol-holster, of blue cloth, adorned with gold-lashes and 7,75 ells (≈4,6 m) of wide and narrow gold-lacing for the common-Drabants, and even more for the higher ranks. Both corners of the shabrack were adorned with the king's name, under a royal crown embroidered in gold.

== History ==
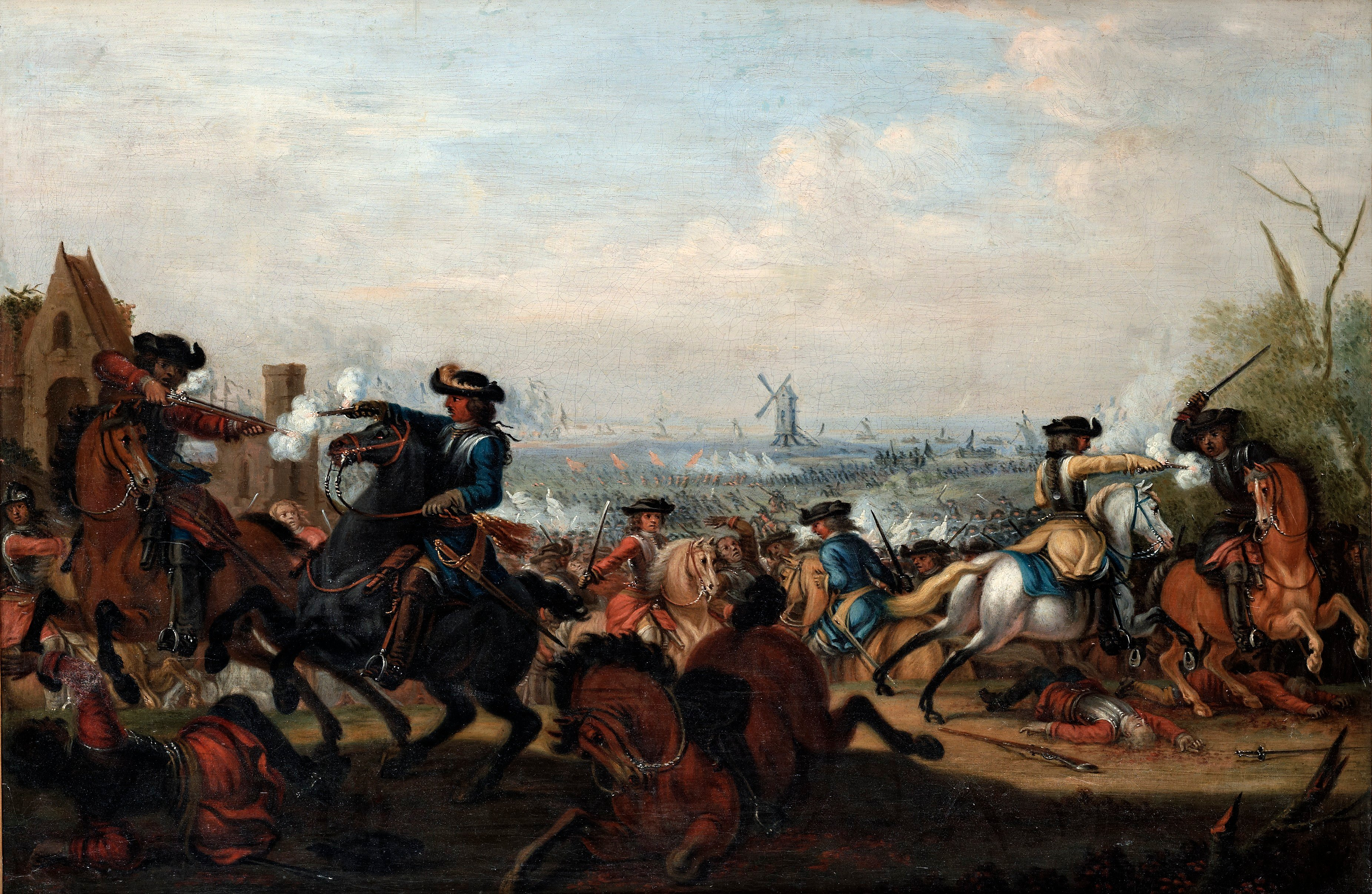
Unspecified cavalry engagement (possibly portraying the Landing at Humlebæk)

The corps departed for the war on 10 May. On 28 July, as Charles XII seized command, it counted 198 men. The Drabants landed on Humlebæk, Zealand by mid-August, after the Swedish infantry had secured the beachhead on 4 August. After peace was signed between Denmark and Holstein-Gottorp, the Drabants returned to Sweden, where they arrived on 1 September.

=== Baltic campaign ===
On 11 October, the 147 Drabants set off from Karlshamn towards Pärnu together with the king's army, to relieve the Swedish town of Narva which was besieged by the Russians under Peter I. On their way, a Russian detachment under Boris Sheremetev was defeated at Pühhajoggi Pass. The Drabants received their baptism of fire in the ensuing Battle of Narva, on 30 November. Following the battle, the corps marched towards Laiuse, where they arrived four days later and established winter encampment with the main army. Although strictly forbidden, duels frequently occurred between the Drabants during this time, leading to five dismissals. Dueling within the corps was a continuing problem during the war years, and would contribute to losses of about 6% of the total strength (compared to 17% who were killed in action or die from their wounds).

The corps did not remain idle between major battles, however, as they frequently accompanied the king in his many ventures. (Note: On 25 June, for the first time the king not only personally exercised the Drabants but also marched them back as their captain into Tartu, with drawn sword.) Next, the Drabants followed the main army in the march towards Riga, which had earlier been besieged by the Saxon army; the two armies met at the banks of the Düna on 19 July 1701, where the Drabants significantly contributed to the victory. Charles XII subsequently occupied Courland and, on 12 December, unexpectedly left his headquarters at Virga to drive the Lithuanians out of Samogitia. Concerned by these developments, Arvid Horn was sent with 480 cavalries, including 40 Drabants, to find him; they reached the king near Kėdainiai followed by a company of eight, after which they escorted him back to Virga. On his arrival there on 9 January 1702, Charles XII ordered the army to proceed further into the Polish–Lithuanian Commonwealth, against Warsaw, capturing the city on 25 May after arriving with the Drabants.

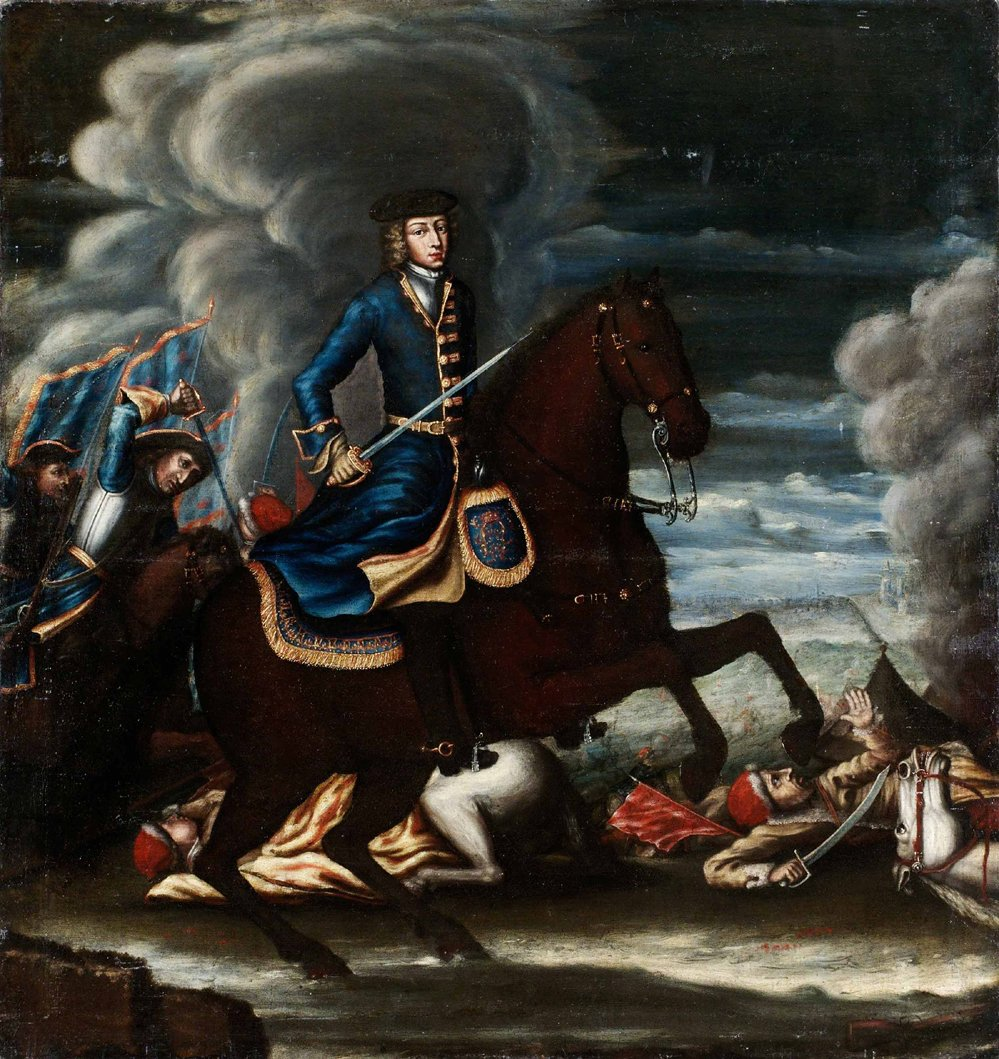
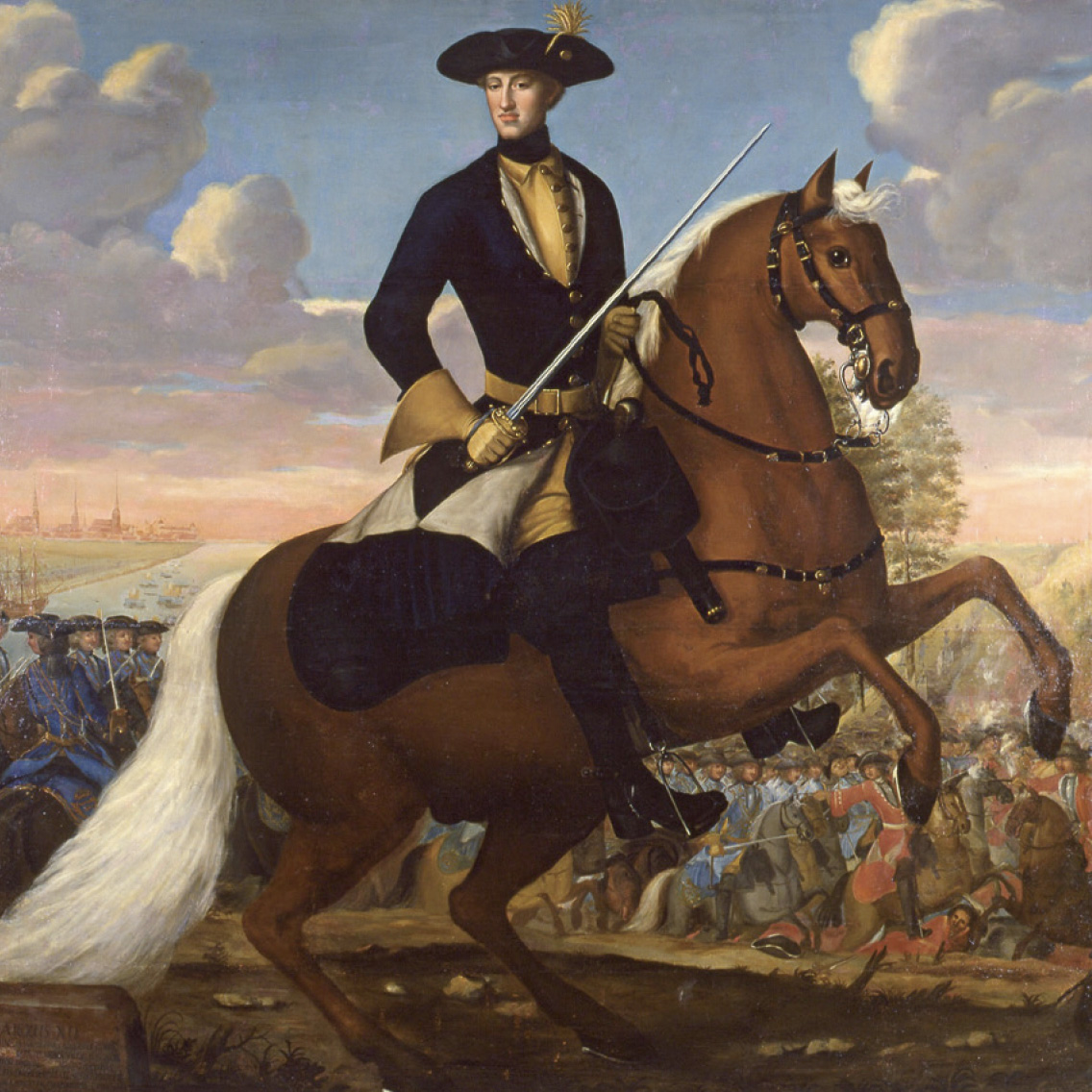
Charles XII with Drabants behind him at the Battle of Narva (top); Charles XII and the Drabants at the Crossing of the Düna (bottom)

==== Narva ====
The corps, counting 151–158 men in two squadrons, was led by Arvid Horn and Carl Gustaf Wrangel. (Note: Generalstaben writes, on page 318, that it amounted to 158 men divided into two companies, but later two squadrons; according to Schreber von Schreeb, it had 151 men and was divided into two squadrons.) It joined the right cavalry-column on the left Swedish wing, under the command of Carl Gustav Rehnskiöld; its task was to cover the left flank of the infantry and break through the Russian entrenchments near the Rathshof bastion, and to subsequently cut off the Russian escape route west—by securing the bridges (especially the Kamperholm Bridge) going over the Narva river (Narova). The Swedish infantry assault was successful, and the attack was soon followed by, among others, the Drabants. At this moment, since Charles XII had seized command over Wrangel's squadron, many Russians could be seen fleeing their entrenchments towards the river. Apart from his Drabants, the king took with him a squadron of dragoons to attack them, forcing them back into the entrenchment. Meanwhile, Horn's squadron rode through the created openings in the entrenchments; once inside, it pressed on towards the Kamperholm Bridge, killing many fleeing Russians in the process.

The bridge soon collapsed under the weight of the fleeing mob, thus isolating the Russian army. A desperate stand was mounted in front of the bridge, with the cover of a wagon fort. During this time, Charles XII rode down into a moat in front of the entrenchments, assisted by Drabant Axel Patrik Thomson (Note: According to Schreber von Schreeb, it was Axel Patrik Thomson assisting the king; according to Sperling, it was the chamberlain Axel Hård.) and two other soldiers, who dragged him up. He then rode to the Drabants, preparing for them to gå-på the Russian wagon fort, however, as the Life Guards of Foot arrived, he instead ordered them to commence the attack. After several attacks, all of which were repulsed, the Russians eventually surrendered. The Drabants had sustained a loss of 11 killed and 28 wounded, (Note: Killed Drabants: Georg Otto Brandt; Lorentz Bröms; Lars Carpelan; Anders Elgbergh; Johan Gordon; Erik Leijonhufvud; Knut Leijonhufvud; Anders Nygren; Michael Schrader; Reinhold Wrangel af Adinal; Fabian Yxkull. Mortally wounded Drabants: Olof Collberg; Per von Günthersberch; Bengt Johan Horn af Kanckas; Carl Fredrik Horn af Åminne; Fredrik von Preutz.) of which five later died from their wounds; the corps had an effective strength of 95 men after the battle, excluding 17 men who were sick. In total, the Swedes had 667 killed and 1,247 wounded, in comparison, between 7,000 and 12,000 Russians were killed (according to their own estimates). After the battle, Charles made a victorious entry into Narva with his Drabants. The following day, a Russian company that had been dispersed during the fight was captured by Thomson.

==== Düna ====
In the battle, the Drabants contributed 135–140 men formed into one squadron, led by Arvid Horn; they were part of the small contingent of cavalry that was positioned on the right Swedish wing, which stretched north of the Garras redoubt. Before the Drabants landed, the infantry had established a foothold, and the Saxon general launched an attack with 2,000 infantry and 1,500 cavalry. The Drabants encountered the outermost cuirassier squadron on the Saxon left wing, (Note: At this point, the cavalry on the right Swedish wing consisted of only the Drabants and 50 men from the Life Regiment of Horse, out of 335 cavalries that were initially meant for that wing.) which charged sword in hand and, notwithstanding their volley, quickly fell back in disarray towards their second line. The squadron rallied and again attacked, but with the same outcome. The success was replicated along the Swedish line which steadily pressed on, pushing the enemy 200 paces inland.

At this time, with the first attack beaten back, Adam Heinrich von Steinau arrived with reinforcements, took command and prepared for another attack. The outnumbered Swedes had their left flank anchored to the river, so von Steinau instead sent all his cavalry to their unsupported right, where the Drabants stood. The Saxon squadrons were charged and then chased away by the Drabants. Because of the disparity in numbers, additional Saxon squadrons were able to turn against the Swedish flanks, causing disorder among the ranks—the Drabants canceled their pursuit, turned around, and decisively fell into their rear, allowing the Swedish army to beat back even this attack. At this time, as the Drabants received needed reinforcements from the Life Regiment of Horse, a final attack was launched against their flank but was likewise repulsed, after which the Saxons retreated. The Swedes were unable to pursue the Saxons to any larger extent since the floating bridge, meant to transfer over the bulk of cavalry, had not been completed. Instrumental to the Swedish victory, the Drabants suffered only two men killed and 19 wounded (one mortally), (Note: Killed Drabants: Richard von Tiesenhausen; Sven Wickström. Mortally wounded Drabant: Peter Crusebjörn.) among them the captain lieutenant. The Swedes sustained a loss of 100 killed and 400 wounded in total, against 2,000 killed, wounded and captured of the enemy.

=== Polish and Saxon campaigns ===
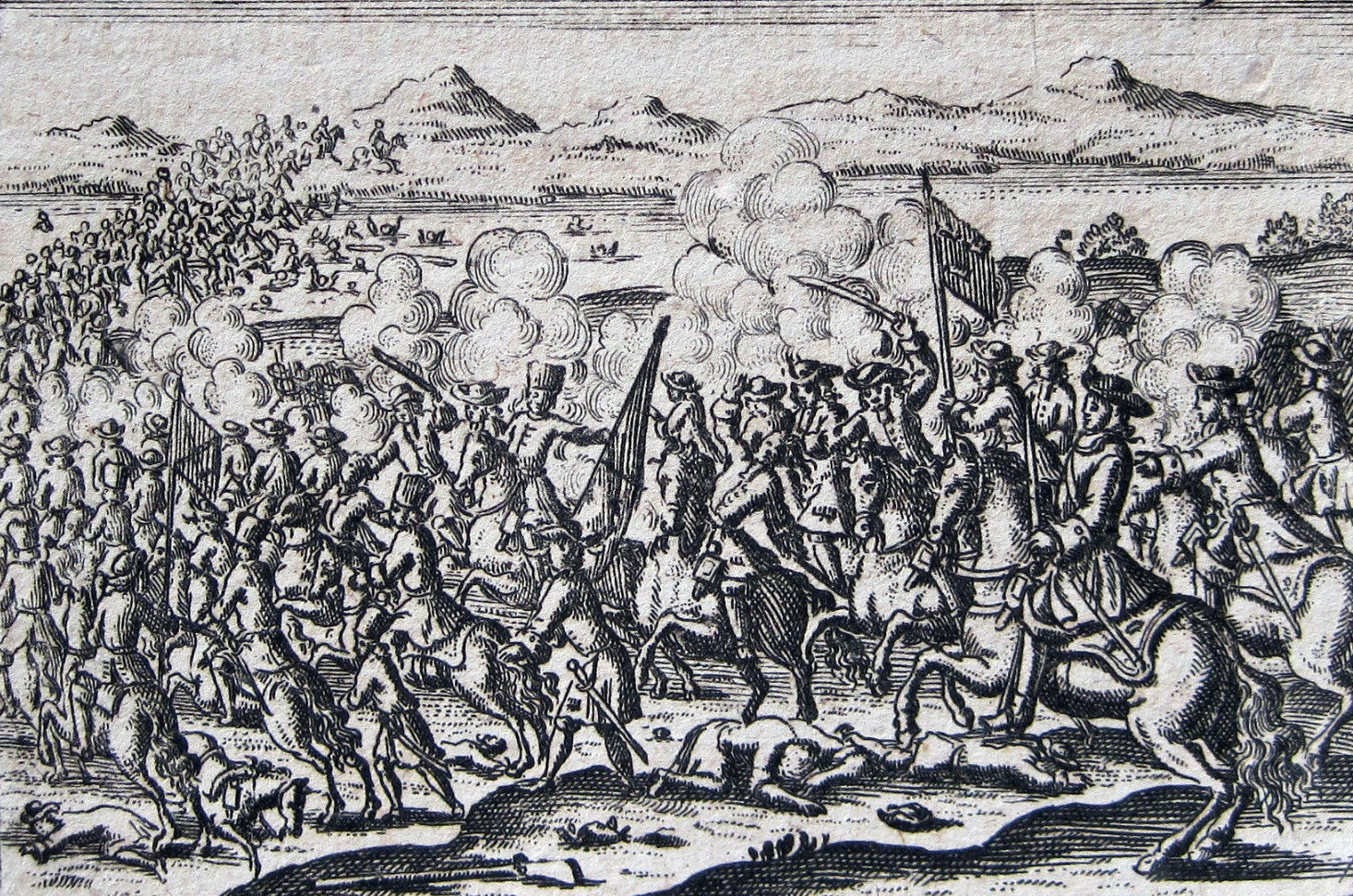
Drabants at the Battle of Pułtusk; the Saxons can be seen retreating over the river

During the first half of 1702, in the Swedish invasion of the Commonwealth, the Drabants participated in many ceremonies in which the king received Polish and Lithuanian magnates. The corps later fought valiantly against the Saxons under Augustus II at the Battle of Kliszów, on 19 July, which led to the capture of Kraków. Here, Charles broke his leg as his horse fell during a demonstration of horsemanship by Stenbock's newly raised squadron of Wallachian-style cavalry. The Drabants brought the king inside the town, where they quartered for some time. Following his recovery, they fought in the cavalry engagement at Pułtusk in 1703, where the Saxons lost more than 1,200 horsemen to 20 Swedes. Afterwards, they marched in the vanguard, which drove the Saxon outposts back into Toruń; the town was taken on 14 October, following a siege that cost the Saxons near 6,000 killed and captured—to only 40 killed Swedish casualties. The Drabants camped near Charles XII as per usual, and had to endure some enemy artillery fire. On 17 May 1704 in Lidzbark, stable master Axel Hård died from his wounds after he was accidentally shot by Charles XII during a Drabant-exercise, two days earlier. (Note: On 5 May, Charles XII was exercising shock tactics with his Drabants, by splitting them up into two groups (one led by him and the other by one of his generals). Seemingly distracted with the departure of the prince Sobieski, he forgot to remove the ramrod out of his pistol; as the two groups then engaged, Charles fired the ramrod into Hård's chest, mortally wounding him. The accident deeply saddened Charles for some time, as witnessed by others.)

So long as I have ten Drabants by my side I shall always face them, even by the hundreds. (Note: At one instance near Warsaw, as Charles XII was seen traveling with a bodyguard of a mere 12 Drabants, the king received warnings from a messenger sent by the French ambassador du Héron; the Frenchman informed Charles of an enemy party of 50 men in the vicinity, far superior to his own, to which Charles simply replied: "I thank you, but tell whoever sent you that I'm not concerned: So long as I have ten Drabants by my side I shall always face them, even by the hundreds".)

— Charles XII

On 6 September, the corps participated in the Storming of Lemberg (Lviv) in which Drabant Jöran Silfverhielm personally captured the garrison commander, Franciszek Gałecki, hiding in a Jesuit monastery. The Drabants then witnessed the Polish surprise attack on the Swedish camp outside the town. When the king received news of Arvid Horn's surrender at Warsaw, (Note: Horn was exchanged with one of the captured Russian generals at Narva, Ludwig Nicolaus von Hallart, in early 1705.) he marched back to expel the Saxons from Poland. When the Swedish army crossed the Vistula by the end of October, the enemies fled Warsaw. Many were captured in the pursuit. At one occasion, three Drabants disarmed and captured 21 Russians and Saxons. The Drabants, unable to catch up with the king, instead marched with Otto Vellingk's army. On 1 November, they encountered 300 cavalries in a rearguard, killing most of them while capturing a major and 60 soldiers. Vellingk, along with his five regiments (including the Drabants), arrived at Poniec the day after the battle and then marched to Tillendorf. There, on 8 November, they intercepted 600–700 Russians in a wagon fort; the Russian force was annihilated after a brave defence—five were captured and the rest killed, against 21 killed and 50 wounded Swedes. By the end of the month, Charles and the Drabants went into cantonment around Rawicz.

In early 1705, Lagercrona was ordered by Charles to raise a 200-man strong Trabant Corps (referred to as Carabiniers) for the new Polish king Stanisław I, (Note: They were later part of the army under Józef Potocki which retreated out of Poland upon receiving the news of the Swedish defeat at Poltava. The Russians caught up with them at Odolanów, by which time Potocki ordered the Carabiniers along with other Polish units to counterattack; this was done with such vigour that the Russians were defeated with a loss of 1,500 men, allowing the army to reach Silesia. While attempting to reach Charles XII through Hungary, they soon met with Francis II Rákóczi and got involved into his war of independence against the Holy Roman Empire; Stanisław's Carabiniers fought bravely at the Battle of Romhány in 1710, charging sword in hand.) modeled after the Swedish Drabants; the unit, with Stanisław Poniatowski as a colonel and four lieutenants under him, were likewise issued fine clothing and weaponry to match their high salary. The Swedish Drabants decamped in late July and, after receiving news of the Battle of Warsaw, moved to Błonie, from where Charles could safeguard the coronation of Stanisław Leszczyński. Once completed, and with peace secured between Sweden and Poland, he marched against the Russian main army at Grodno. Frequent skirmishes occurred; 11 Drabants (with their servants) defeated a larger Russian detachment on 15 January, killing 50. Charles then starved the Russians out of Grodno, before moving against Saxony, of which the main army had been decisively defeated at Fraustadt; the Swedes, with the king and Drabants up front, went through Silesia (part of the Holy Roman Empire) to Saxony, crossing its border on 6 September. By this time, the Drabants numbered 100 men. After peace had been established and the regiments rested and replenished, (Note: Whilst in Saxony, the Drabants, of which one corporalship always remained as bodyguards, were depicted in the famous copperplate with Charles XII and Augustus I dining in Altranstädt, on 17 December 1706.) Charles decamped from Saxony at the beginning of September the next year—launching the campaign against Russia. On 6 January 1706, Arvid Horn had resigned his post as captain lieutenant. He was replaced by Carl Gustaf Wrangel on 12 July. Carl died from disease on 8 June 1707 and was replaced by Otto Wrangel on 22 August.

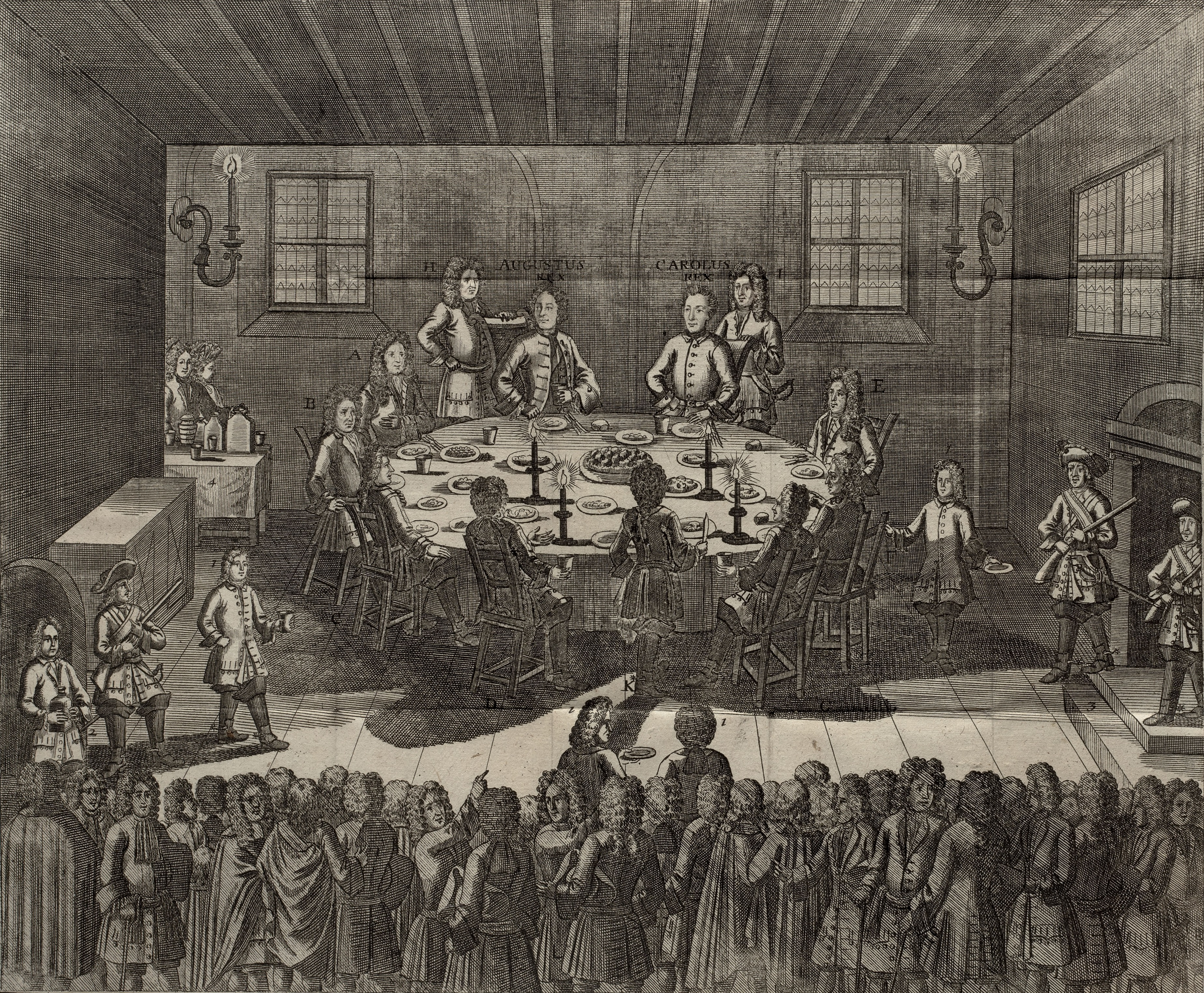
Charles XII and August I following the Peace of Altranstädt; three Drabants with carbines can be seen standing guard

==== Kliszów ====
The corps counted 147 men, and was formed into one squadron led by Carl Gustaf Wrangel. It fought in the first line (which was commanded by Arvid Horn) on the right Swedish wing, under Carl Gustav Rehnskiöld. To circumvent the advantageous Saxon position, Charles started wheeling his line to the left—until the Polish Crown Army suddenly appeared on the Saxon flank, forcing him to halt. Instead of awaiting an inevitable Saxon–Polish attack, Charles seized the initiative with his left-wing and marched straight at them. The Poles and the Saxon right were forced to retreat after a fierce struggle, while the Swedish center began traversing the morass between them and the Saxon infantry, preparing to attack.

During this time, von Steinau, commanding the left Saxon cavalry-wing where the best troops remained, commenced an attack on the unprepared Swedish right cavalry-wing; the Saxons, enjoying a twofold numerical advantage, (Note: The Saxon left wing consisted of 34 squadrons with roughly 125 men in each, while the Swedish right-wing opposing them consisted of 21 squadrons with roughly 100 men in each; thus 4,250 Saxons against 2,100 Swedes.) attempted to cut the Swedish wing off from their center, by simultaneously attacking them in the front, flank and rear. The Swedish squadrons received the onslaught with their backs "turned into each other", with the Drabants facing the Swedish center. The Swedes, in contrast to their enemy, charged sword in hand, forcing the Saxons to retire in all directions. The Drabants then pursued the beaten enemy squadrons, but were suddenly attacked in the rear by another one. They made an about-turn; the rear rank formed the front, and quickly threw this salient back in disarray.

Rehnskiöld assembled his troops and marched over the morass, where the bulk of the Saxon squadrons had rallied. Von Steinau counter-attacked, but was decisively defeated, largely thanks to the Drabants. Most of his squadrons reached safety on the west bank of the Nida. The Swedish infantry, meanwhile, captured the enemy field artillery and aimed it at the Saxons, forcing them to retreat. Straggling Saxon regiments, or those stuck in the marshes, were destroyed. The Drabants, who had distinguished themselves, lost one or two colonels killed and one wounded, (Note: The only confirmed death is colonel Adam Johan Aminoff. According to Adlerfelt, another unidentified colonel was killed while a third one was wounded.) with an unknown number of killed and wounded commoners. Arvid Horn was again wounded. In total, the Swedes suffered 300 killed and between 500 and 800 wounded. The Saxons and Poles lost about 2,000 killed and wounded, and 2,000 captured. As a reward for their performance in the battle, Charles XII pardoned six Drabants who had been dismissed for dueling.

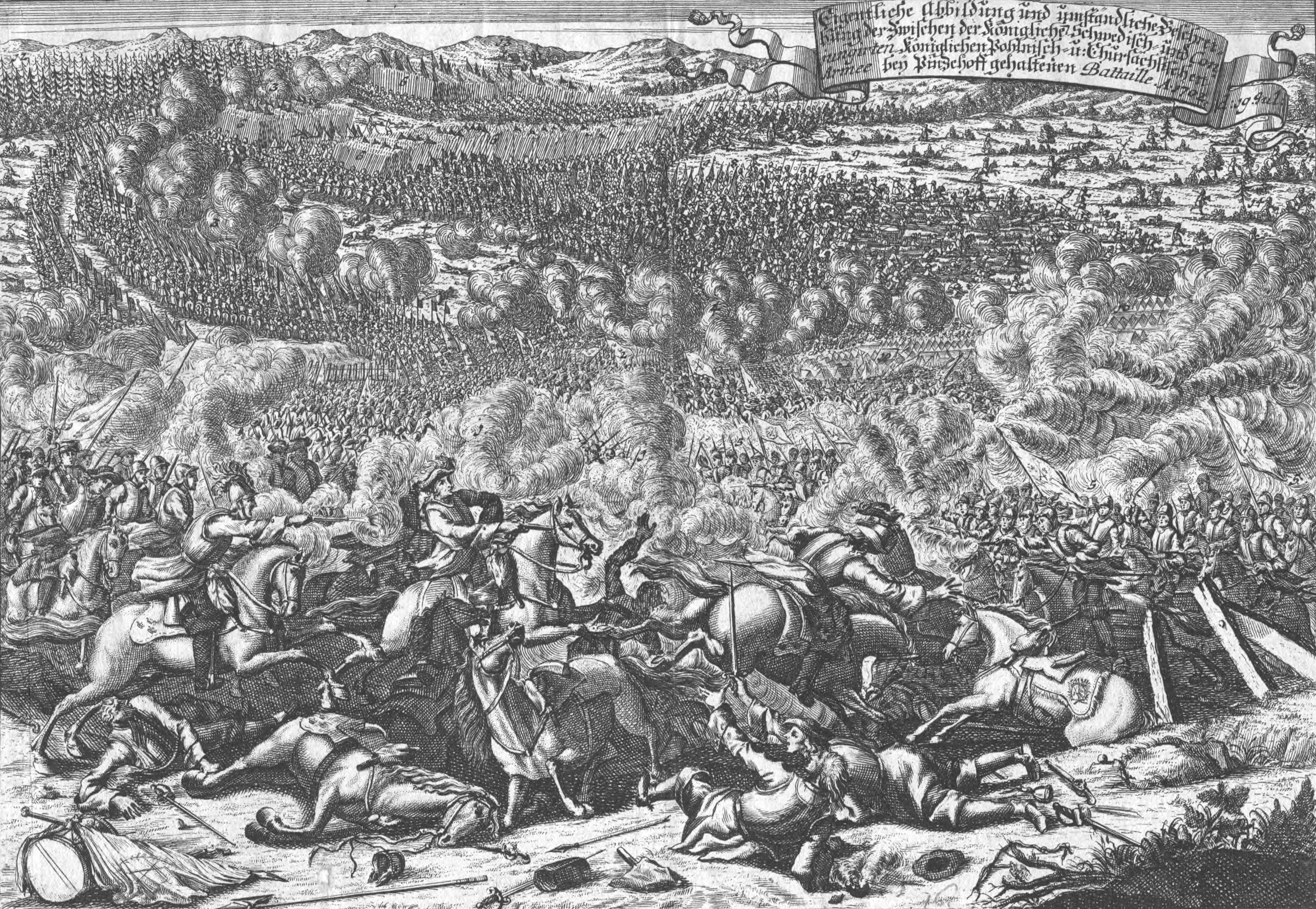
Battle of Kliszów; the cavalry engagement with the Drabants can be seen in the foreground

=== Russian campaign ===
Following the winter encampment in Saxony, Sweden launched an invasion of Russia. The Drabants, numbering 150, marched in the vanguard with the king and encountered fierce guerrilla warfare in the forests of Masuria. Once through, the Drabants stayed at Nowa Wola until 8 February while Charles advanced to Grodno, where he defeated 1,000–2,000 Russians at the Neman bridge on 7 February 1708.

On 25 June, the king and the Drabants reached Byerazino, where they observed 600 Russian dragoons standing across the river. When Charles reconnoitered with his bodyguard, 200 Russians swam over and attacked him. They were driven back with a loss of 40 men as Swedish reinforcements arrived.

On 10 July, Charles XII, the Drabants, and the Life Guards of Foot reached the outskirts of Holowczyn, forcing the Russian outposts to retreat over the Vabich (a marshy tributary of the Drut river) without a fight.

Four days later, the corps fought valiantly at the Battle of Holowczyn, losing its captain lieutenant Otto Wrangel. Peter I in a letter to Fyodor Apraksin, claimed the Drabants—whom he viewed as a role model for every European army—had lost their general along with half of the force. On 10 September, they witnessed the Battle of Malatitze, and ten days later fought at the Skirmish at Rajovka, arriving among the first group save the king, who was surrounded by a large enemy force. By the end of 1708, as the army turned towards Ukraine, the corps counted 146 men in the lines. The following year, the Drabants participated in the February-offensive to dislodge the nearby Russian units and scorch the land west of the Vorskla:

At the Battle of Opishnia on 7 February, 2,500 Swedes routed 6,000 Russians, killing or capturing 266–650 while losing only two or three killed (including the Drabant Otto Reinhold Pihlmeijer) and 10–17 wounded. (Note: The Russians counter-attacked Opishnia on 9 February with 2,000 men, as only 50 Swedes defended the town—in which 30 sick Swedish soldiers, and Russian prisoners of war, also remained. The Swedes resisted until sunset, when the Russians managed to set the town on fire; only 15 Swedes managed to escape.) The force then attacked Khukhra on 19 February, killing or capturing 150–200 Russians, out of a force of 1,000–2,000, to merely one or two Swedes. They attacked Krasnokutsk–Gorodnoye on 21 February, killing above a thousand Russians. (Note: In addition to the battles in which the Drabants fought, 200–300 Russians had also been killed or captured at Hrun on 30 January, and 400 at Oleshnya on 21 February, as the Swedes stormed the town; the Russians had thus lost at least 2,000 men since 30 January.)

The Drabants quartered at Krasna Luka when Charles launched a costly assault on Veprik, on 18 January 1709. During the night of 11–12 May, the king laid siege to Poltava. On 18 May, the Russians attempted to force Charles to end the siege by attacking Opishnia. The Drabants fought alongside the king and forced the Russians back over the Vorskla, losing 200 killed to 150–200 Swedes. On 26 June, the Russians again crossed the river and prepared an ambush. Smaller skirmishes were initially fought against the Cossacks of Ivan Mazepa (allied to Charles since late 1708). When the Drabants arrived they compelled the Russians to retreat without a fight.

The siege culminated in the disastrous Swedish defeat at Poltava on 8 July, costing the Drabants heavy casualties. The battle, as well as the following Surrender at Perevolochna, was a devastating blow to Charles, who managed to escape over the river of Dnieper with a small part of the army, including 101 Drabants. Apart from those lost in the battle, four Drabants were captured at Perevolochna. (Note: Captured Drabants: G. Wilhelm von Freijmann; Adolf Gyllenpistol; Johan Fredrik von Kursell; Fabian Wilhelm Wrangel.) The king arrived at Bender in August, lying on a horse stretcher with the Drabants by his side.

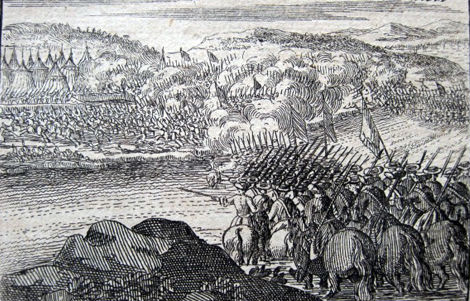
Drabants, among the Swedish cavalry, crosses the marshes at the Battle of Holowczyn

==== Holowczyn ====
The corps, consisting of 120–134 men, (Note: According to Adlerfelt: 120 men; Nordberg: 125 men; Schreber von Schreeb: 134 men.) was formed into one squadron under the command of Otto Wrangel. It was part of the first line of cavalry that would cross the Vabich under Carl Gustav Rehnskiöld. The Swedish objective was to prevent the Russian wings from supporting each other. At 03:00, three hours later than the infantry, the squadrons started moving under the cover of a Swedish artillery barrage. Anikita Repnin was caught by surprise and offered only minimal resistance before commencing a general retreat, pursued by the Swedish infantry. The Swedish squadrons traversed the marshes behind the infantry with great difficulty. Rehnskiöld ordered the first two squadrons across to counterattack three regiments of Russian dragoons at Visoki (from von Goltz' command), coming to attack the Swedish infantry in the right flank and rear. After having defeated their vanguard of about 200 men, the Swedes encountered six and a half Russian squadrons that followed them. Fierce fighting erupted, with the two Swedish squadrons hardly pressed until the Drabants arrived and immediately charged. (Note: According to one account, the Drabants: "met with five Russian squadrons sword in hand and defeated them one after another. They advances so far into the lines of their enemies that they were at great risk, had not aid arrived." Another one goes: "one has to praise the order and bravery displayed by the Drabants, for everything they attacked was overthrown, and everything opposing them was attacked. Surrounded on all sides, they swung back and forth like a yarn roll; it seemed as if their enemies had played the child's game—avoid the creature [the Drabants]") Split into corporalships (smaller groups), the Drabants launched ten subsequent attacks which overthrew one Russian squadron after another. The Swedes were on the brink of defeat when an additional three and a half Russian squadrons arrived, while Kalmucks constantly harassed them in the rear. They were saved when two fresh Swedish squadrons arrived and attacked the rear of the Russians, defeating them.

The remaining five squadrons of the three Russian dragoon regiments (as well as a company of grenadiers) were beaten nearby by two other Swedish squadrons. Rehnskiöld then pursued to Gnjasdin, where the fleeing Russians collided with a force under Goltz (three dragoon regiments and three grenadier companies) which was in the process of forming into battle formation. Rehnskiöld's cavalry—now numbering 13 squadrons including the Drabants—quickly charged and defeated the Russian force.

Goltz's four remaining regiments met the same faith as they, unaware of his defeat, marched straight into Rehnskiöld who ambushed them in a forest glade. Charles arrived in person and took command over the cavalry, pursuing the Russians for another 16 km under frequent fighting. After a brief demonstration by Boris Sheremetev's command against the Swedish baggage train, the Russian forces retreated towards the Dnieper. The Drabants had lost their captain lieutenant, their quartermaster, the adjutant and six others, (Note: Killed Drabants: Otto Magnus Wrangel af Adinal; Hans Wattrang; Claes Hierta; Johan Barckman; Paul von Damm; Henrik Horn af Marienborg; Paul Gustaf Palbitzki; Otto Henrik von Palmenbach; Johan Georg Ramsay. Mortally wounded Drabants: Henrik zur Mühlen; Carl Mörling; Henrik Ridderborg.) while 31–36 were wounded (three mortally). The total Swedish loss was 265–267 killed and 1,018–1,028 wounded, while the Russians had more than 3,000 casualties. The killed Swedish soldiers were honorably buried in the entrenchment-grave, with Drabants placed in the "poste d'honneur"—furthest to the right. Charles was so satisfied with the performance of his Drabants that he bought new horses for the ones who had lost theirs in the battle. (Note: The Swedish king was very caring for his corps, often using his own expensive sheets and fabric to bandage the wounded Drabants after combat.)

Our Drabants always do well, and we shall remember them. (Note: After the battle, Rehnskiöld told Charles XII that, despite their high cost, the Drabants barely received their worth in coins; for the battle had largely been won thanks to them—to which Charles replied: "Yes, our Drabants always do well, and we shall remember them".)

— Charles XII

==== Gorodnoye ====
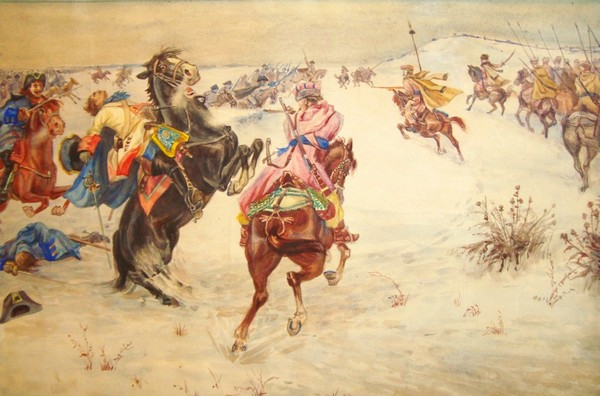
Drabants and Cossacks near Gorodnoye

The Drabants counted up to 145 men, formed into one squadron under Gustaf Hård, (Note: After the death of Otto Wrangel at Holowczyn, Gustaf Hård was appointed the commander in his place—although he officially became the captain lieutenant in 1710.) and were part of a cavalry contingent led by the king. In response to the Swedish winter offensive, Peter ordered the bulk of his infantry to retreat from Okhtyrka as he wanted to avoid a potentially decisive battle. To delay the Swedes, he left a significant force (perhaps 18 regiments) of mostly cavalry around Krasnokutsk and Gorodnoye, under Carl Ewald von Rönne. On 21 February, Charles captured a Russian outpost 10 km northwest of Krasnokutsk that revealed the Russian force dispositions, consisting of seven regiments (or 5,000 men) under von Schauenburg. Charles galloped to Krasnokutsk with 2,500 cavalry, including the Drabants, and attacked the Russians the same day—in what has later characterized as the "proudest day of the Swedish cavalry."

The Swedes, with Charles and the Drabants upfront, achieved total surprise, killing hundreds of Russians in the streets, gardens and farms, while others were forced driven off with grenades. The Russian horses were much inferior to their own, letting the Drabants wreak havoc in their lines. The Russians, who fled towards Gorodnoye half a mile to the north-east, formed up in order de bataille halfway there, at a very advantageous position with protected flanks. The Swedes broke through the Cossacks and Kalmucks who screened their front and continued towards the dragoons. Seeing this, the Russians again retreated; one part past Gorodnoye to the right and the other to the left through its suburbs. The enemies were relentlessly massacred as they were chased through the narrow streets.

The Swedish pursuit continued through the suburbs, over a height, and past a millpond. Suddenly a large Russian force suddenly appeared from Gorodnoye, fielding on their right flank six dragoon regiments and two battalions, or 10,000 men, under von Rönne. Because the Swedish cavalry had been dispersed or halted, (Note: One part of the Swedish cavalry had pursued the Russians who fled along the right side of Gorodnoye. These had, however, been forced back the way they came, in a manner which was both "shameful and displeasing to see", according to Nordberg.) the king had but 600 men by his side. Many Drabants had to dismount their exhausted horses and fight on foot, gallantly charged into their lines. The Swedish dragoons, however, were repulsed after receiving fierce volleys from the Russian infantry, whose numbers increased rapidly. Fruitless attempts were made by Charles to rally them, but their depleted banners fell back, dragging the king with them. Abandoned, the Drabants soon fell back to the height as well, where the king rallied his few troops. They had been unable to break through, but their efforts had temporarily stunned the Russians. After a while, the dispersed Swedish cavalry rallied under Kruse, who arrived and forced the enemies to retreat from the battle. The Swedes then scorched the two small towns. Allegedly, the Drabants had killed 115 Russians at Gorodnoye, (Note: Robert Petre writes: "I counted from the town of Gorodnoye, where the massacre began [sic], to Krasnokutsk, 639 killed (...) in the town of Krasnokutsk, where we arrived at 10 o'clock in the morning (...) I counted 115 killed, all of which had been pierced by Drabant-swords"; since he counted these bodies at the last place [Gorodnoye], Petre must have mixed up the names. Norsbergh writes: "the king rode into the town of Krasnokutsk with the cavalry and immediately started cutting down the enemies (...) they retreated, one part past Gorodnoye to the right, and the other to the left through its suburb with Charles, the Drabants, and a regiment of dragoons, hot on their heels. Withdrawn swords, the enemies were chased through the narrow streets and relentlessly massacred." According to Nordberg, an additional 400 Russians also died when they fell through the ice on the Merla River.) and many more during the pursuit between the small towns, where 639 bodies were subsequently counted. The Drabants had up to 10 men killed and one captured, (Note: Killed Drabants: Carl Gustaf von Chemnitz; Erland Cronmark; Georg Johan von Essen; Alexander Hummer; Carl Magnus Hård; Johan Lagermarck; Louis Arnold Pels; Nils Posse; Otto Gustaf Sittman; Jacob Johan Taube af Odenkat. Captured Drabant: Otto Eberhard Lode från Lifland.) with an unknown amount of wounded. In total, the Russians had lost 1,000–1,200 in killed, to only 130 Swedes.

==== Poltava ====
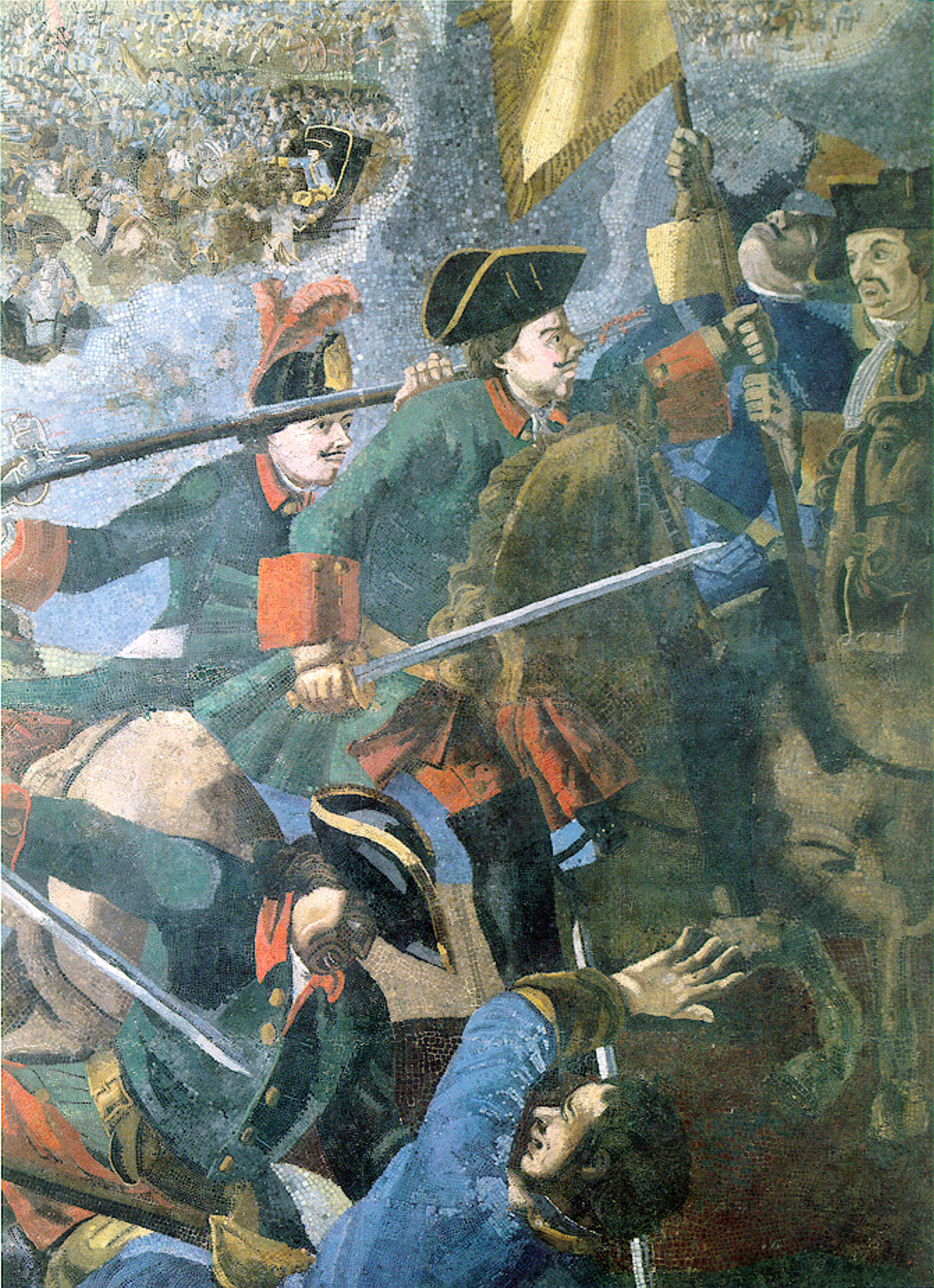
Battle of Poltava; Charles XII is highlighted in the background

The corps counted 100–131 men, (Note: According to Nordberg: 100 men; Kuylenstierna: 115 men; Schreber von Schreeb: 131 men (including wounded).) of which one corporalship guarded the bullet-wounded Charles XII; (Note: The Swedish king was shot in the foot on 27 June and had been close to dying in the following days.) it was formed into one squadron under Gustaf Hård, belonging to the right cavalry-wing, consisting of three columns under Gustaf Creutz. About 17,000 Swedes would attack at least 60,000 Russians. The battle began at dawn, as the ten Swedish columns marched towards the two coherent lines of Russian redoubts in a 'T' shape. They protected their fortified camp, while the Russians brought up dragoons to support them. One part of the Swedish infantry assaulted the vertical redoubts, while the rest continued forward to break through the horizontal ones. Creutz's wing, led by the Drabants and two other regiments, simultaneously attacked the Russian dragoons by the redoubts, but found confusion at first. As order was restored, the dragoons pushed past the redoubts to the open, where they stood no chance against the pursuing Swedish cavalry. As the bulk of the infantry penetrated the horizontal line, about eight Drabants bodyguarding Charles were lost to the crossfire, or Cossacks and Kalmucks launching attacks against the columns.

During this time, one-third of the Swedish infantry was bogged down, fighting the vertical redoubts; this isolated contingent was later destroyed when the Russians sent a much superior force against them. The Swedish cavalry, which was pursuing the dragoons and almost had them trapped against a stream or gulley, (Note: Recalling the victorious Swedish cavalry from the pursuit—which would most likely have ended with the trapping of the Russian dragoons—has often been considered to be one of the main reasons for the defeat.) was recalled to rendezvous with the rest of the army. The Drabant squadron was sent to find the missing third of the infantry, but the Russian presence at the redoubts complicated this task. In the next battle Charles positioned behind the right-wing. Surprising the Swedes, Peter I seized the initiative and marched on them, who stood in a position offering only limited maneuverability. Most of the cavalry stood formed up behind their respective infantry wings. To give the cavalry maneuvering space, Rehnskiöld ordered a general advance against the approaching Russians, whose line extended much further than the Swedish one. (Note: In the main battle, the Swedish infantry counted roughly 4,000 men while the Russian counterpart had 21,000–22,000 men.)

The infantry on the right wing was initially successful, in that they quickly pushed the first Russian line back, capturing some of their guns, while the heavily outnumbered battalions on the left began wavering against devastating artillery fire. At this crucial moment, cavalry support was needed on both wings. Creutz was slightly delayed and ran into uninvolved Russian battalions further out to the right, instead of attacking the already shaken ones. After bouncing against their squares, he turned his attention to Russian squadrons on his right flank, chasing them away—but abandoning the infantry. As the left cavalry-wing was also unable to coordinate an attack, both infantry-wings were crucially deprived of cavalry support and subsequently collapsed. During the infantry rout, desperate attempts were made by the Swedish cavalry to halt the Russian onslaught. Charles' retreat was cut off by the Russians, and he ordered the Drabants to break through at all cost. (Note: Christian Giertta writes: "The king issued an order for lieutenant Hiertta [Johan Giertta] to cut a path through with the Drabants, which occurred, but the king only reached a mere 40 paces before his litter was destroyed. Hiertta then gave him his horse, for the king had said: Hiertta, give me the horse.") During the ensuing struggle the Drabants cut their way through the Russian line. However, Charles' litter his horse was shot from under him. Lieutenant Johan Giertta gave Charles his horse, allowing him to escape. The Drabants lost 17 killed and at least 6 wounded (including Gustaf Hård), of whom 3 were captured along with 6 others. (Note: Killed Drabants: Carl Johan Berg; Lars Bergh; Bengt Blomberg; Samuel Boisman; Magnus von Brömssen; Carl H. de Maré; Magnus Gabriel von Friesendorff; Peter Gangius; Gustaf Adolf Gyllencreutz; Johan Heer; Henrik Kuuff; Carl Lentz; Johan Gustaf von Poll; Bleckert Lennart Rappe; Jacob Ridderborg; Lars Stårck; Mats Stärck. Captured Drabants: Magnus Clöffer; Gustaf Otto Douglas; Otto Magnus von Essen; Otto Georg Fitinghoff; Magnus Gabriel von Funcken; Erik Pijhlroth; Johan Fredrik Rühel; Bror Rålamb; Claes Örnhielm.) In total, the Swedes lost a minimum of 11,200 killed, wounded and captured, compared to at least 4,500 Russians.

=== After Perevolochna ===
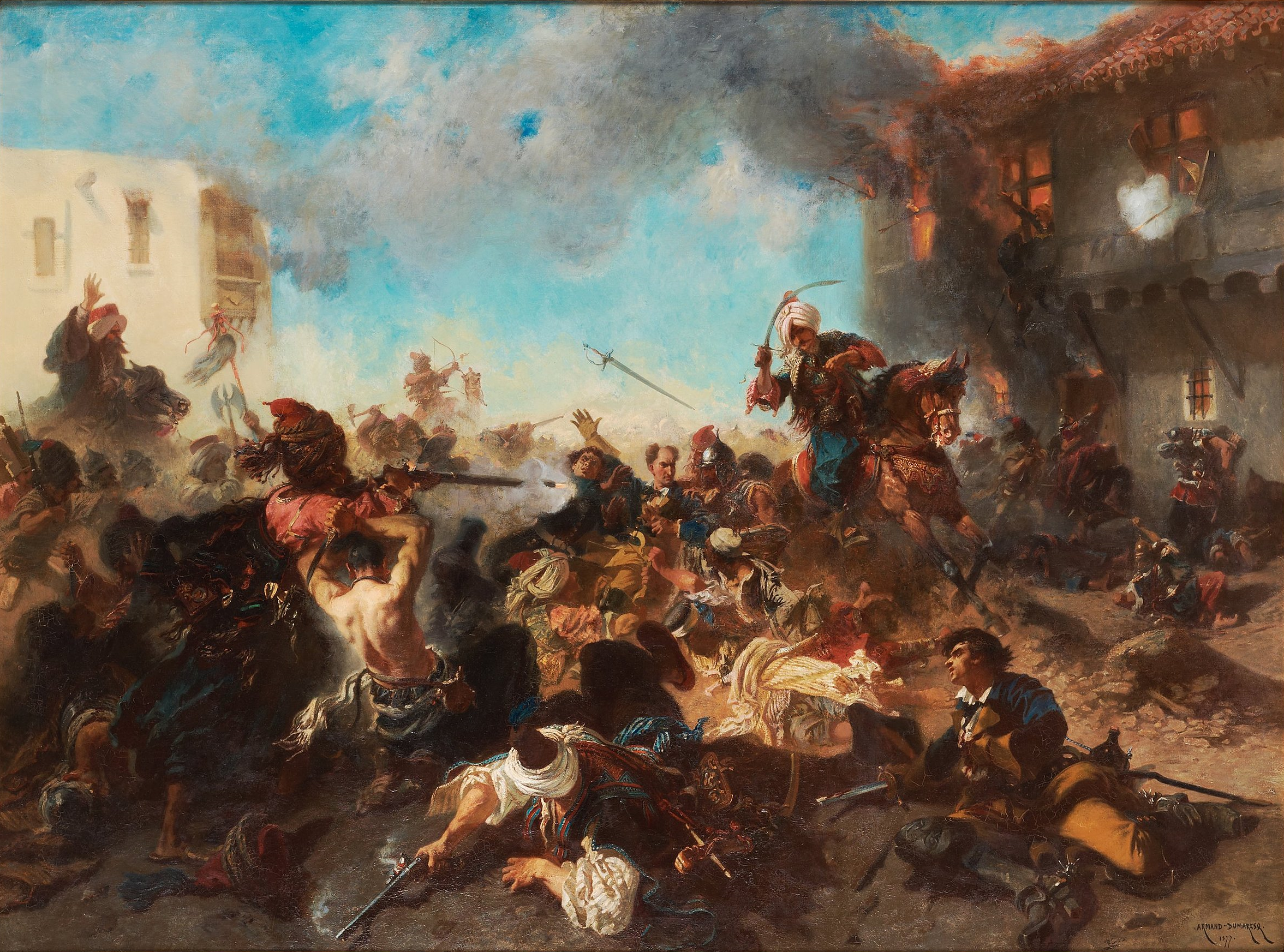
Charles XII and his Drabants are being captured at the Skirmish at Bender

While in Bender, Gustaf Hård was appointed captain lieutenant on 9 February 1710. Several Drabants were part of Gustaf Zülich's expedition of 1711, sent out by Charles to ease cooperation between the Polish and Cossack armies during the Russo-Ottoman War. Some Drabants witnessed Peter's defeat at Stănileşti later in 1711. In December 1712 or January 1713, while still in Bender, a small Swedish commando unit (including six Drabants) intercepted secret documents, informing Charles of Jan Kazimierz' and Khan Giray's alleged plot to hand him over to Augustus II. A month later, the corps was neutralized in the Skirmish at Bender, apart from four Drabants who stayed near Charles to defend the King's house. Drabant Axel Erik Roos reportedly saved the king several times during the encounter. Most of the Swedish prisoners were released within a month.

In the autumn of 1714, as Charles returned to Swedish Pomerania from Turkey, 54 Drabants remained; 20 had died in Turkey, 15 had been transferred to other units, two had been sent home, four had escaped and six had been dismissed. The next March, 50 Drabants were reunited with the king in Stralsund—four had been left behind in the march. The corps participated in the Siege of Stralsund (1715) and later took part in the failed assault on Stresow, in which they formed the vanguard alongside another regiment; four were killed or mortally wounded, while two others were captured. (Note: Killed Drabants: Jacob Bruun; Anders Norman. Mortally wounded Drabants: Erik Gabriel Blomhielm; Werner Tranefelt. Captured Drabants: Evert Fredrik von Saltza; Gabriel Stenberg.) As Stralsund fell in December, Drabants were promised safe passage to Sweden proper and landed at Ystad on 16 June 1716. They now consisted of 37 men, 14 of whom had set sail from Karlshamn on 11 October 1700. Eleven of these were part of the "old order", who had been Drabants since before the reformation of 1700.

Once back in Sweden, the absence of experienced and young officers led the corps to be merged with the Life Squadron. In 1717, Gustaf Hård stepped down as captain lieutenant and was replaced by Johan Giertta, on 18 December.

In 1718, the corps participated in the Norwegian campaign. They departed from Lund on 17 October 1718 and reached Halden on 20 November, during the Siege of Fredriksten. Uncharacteristically, the Drabants were ordered not to stay with the king, instead marching to Eidsberg on 22 November. On 3 December, Charles ordered their captain lieutenant to take some thousand cavalry and clear the eastern side of the Glomma. News of Charles' death arrived on 11 December, the remaining 33 Drabants, as well as the Life Squadron, marched back to Sweden. They played a prominent role at his funeral. After the war, and as a consequence of the cuts in the defense budget, the Life Squadron was dissolved in 1722, while the Drabants went back to their 1695 status. After the war, many Drabants earned high-ranking posts elsewhere: one became field marshal; one became admiral; two became generals; one became the president of the Svea Court of Appeal; three became governors; four became lieutenant generals; ten became major generals; 17 became colonels, while many others were ennobled.

== Notes, citations and sources ==
=== Sources ===
- Adlerfelt, Gustaf (1740a). The Military History of Charles XII. King of Sweden, volume 1. London: J. and P. Knapton. OCLC 15007018.
- Adlerfelt, Gustaf (1740b). The Military History of Charles XII. King of Sweden, volume 2. London: J. and P. Knapton. OCLC 15007018.
- Adlerfelt, Gustaf (1740c). The Military History of Charles XII. King of Sweden, volume 3. London: J. and P. Knapton. OCLC 15007018.
- Antoni, Rudolf (1914). Karolinska förbundets årsbok 1914: Fälttåget i Polen (in Swedish). Stockholm: Karolinska förbundet. OCLC 470214638.
- Carlsson, Einar (1947). Karolinska förbundets årsbok 1947: Krasnokutsk—Gorodnoe—Kolomak (in Swedish). Stockholm: Karolinska förbundet. OCLC 470214638.
- Denndorf, Robert R. (2021). Cronica șederii regelui suedez Carol al XII-lea (1709-1714) în Imperiul Otoman : interferențe româno-suedeze (in Romanian). Bucharest: Editura Militară. ISBN 978-973-32-1186-0.
- Dorrell, Nicholas (2009). The Dawn of the Tsarist Empire: Poltava & the Russian Campaigns of 1708–1709. Nottingham: Partizan Press. ISBN 978-1-85818-594-1.
- From, Peter (2007). Katastrofen vid Poltava: Karl XII:s ryska fälttåg 1707-1709 (in Swedish). Lund: Historiska Media. ISBN 978-91-85377-70-1.
- From, Peter (2009). Kalabaliken i Bender: Karl XII:s turkiska äventyr (in Swedish). Lund: Historiska Media. ISBN 978-91-85507-92-4.
- Generalstaben (1918a). Karl XII på slagfältet: karolinsk slagledning sedd mot bakgrunden av taktikens utveckling från äldsta tider, volume 1 (in Swedish). Stockholm: P. A. Norstedt & söners förlag. OCLC 163888644.
- Generalstaben (1918b). Karl XII på slagfältet: karolinsk slagledning sedd mot bakgrunden av taktikens utveckling från äldsta tider, volume 2 (in Swedish). Stockholm: P. A. Norstedt & söners förlag. OCLC 163888651.
- Generalstaben (1919). Karl XII på slagfältet: karolinsk slagledning sedd mot bakgrunden av taktikens utveckling från äldsta tider, volume 3 (in Swedish). Stockholm: P. A. Norstedt & söners förlag. OCLC 163888660.
- Gjörwell, Carl Christoffer (1761). Det Swenska Biblioteket, volume 5 (in Swedish). Stockholm: Carl Gottlieb Ulf. OCLC 831179474.
- Grimberg, Carl; Uddgren, Hugo (1914). Svenska krigarbragder: Drabanterna vid Gorodnoje (in Swedish). Stockholm: P.A. Norstedt & Söner. OCLC 472743171.
- Ihro Kön. Maj. von Schweden Hof- und Krieges-Staat (in German). Cölln. 1707. OCLC 166116478.
- Kuylenstierna, Oswald (1918). Kring Karl XII: Karl XII:s drabanter (in Swedish). Stockholm: Wahlström & Widstrand. OCLC 15007964.
- Lewenhaupt, Adam (1920–1921). Karl XII:s officerare. Biografiska anteckningar (in Swedish). Stockholm: P. A. Norstedt & Söners förlag. OCLC 15934571.
- Livrustkammaren, "Drabantvärja — Värja m:1717 för ryttare vid Livskvadronen", Emuseumplus (in Swedish)
- Nordberg, Jöran (1740a). Konung Carl den XII:tes Historia, volume 1 (in Swedish). Stockholm: Pet. Momma. OCLC 256604521.
- Nordberg, Jöran (1740b). Konung Carl den XII tes Historia, volume 2 (in Swedish). Stockholm: Nyström. OCLC 256603540.
- Nordberg, Jöran (1745). Leben Karl des Zwölften Königs in Schweden mit Münzen und Kupfern, volume 1 (in German). Hamburg: Trausold. OCLC 162299514.
- Post- och Inrikes Tidningar (1704). "Ordinarie Stockholmiske Post-Tijender: Af den 15 Novembris" (in Swedish). Stockholm. OCLC 660060850.
- Post- och Inrikes Tidningar (1705). "Ordinarie Stockholmiske Post-Tijender: Af den 14 Martij" (in Swedish). Stockholm. OCLC 660060850.
- Post- och Inrikes Tidningar (1708). "Ordinaire Stockholmiske Post Tidender: Af den 25 Februarij" (in Swedish). Stockholm. OCLC 660060850.
- Post- och Inrikes Tidningar (1709). "Ordinaire Stockholmiske Post Tidender: Af den 7 Decembris" (in Swedish). Stockholm. OCLC 660060850.
- Quennerstedt, August (1901). Karolinska krigares dagböcker jämte andra samtida skrifter, volume 1 (in Swedish). Lund: Gleerupska univ. bokhandeln. OCLC 186563462.
- Quennerstedt, August (1907). Karolinska krigares dagböcker jämte andra samtida skrifter, volume 3 (in Swedish). Lund: Gleerupska univ. bokhandeln. OCLC 186563487.
- Quennerstedt, August (1909). Karolinska krigares dagböcker jämte andra samtida skrifter, volume 5 (in Swedish). Lund: Gleerupska univ. bokhandeln. OCLC 186563507.
- Quennerstedt, August (1912). Karolinska krigares dagböcker jämte andra samtida skrifter, volume 6 (in Swedish). Lund: Gleerupska univ. bokhandeln. OCLC 186563513.
- Quennerstedt, August (1913). Karolinska krigares dagböcker jämte andra samtida skrifter, volume 8 (in Swedish). Lund: Gleerupska univ. bokhandeln. OCLC 186563531.
- Relation om de emellan hans kongl. may:tt af Swerige, och desz fiender, ifrån den 17. octobris til den 1. novembris 1704. i Stor-Pohlen förefalne träffningar (in Swedish). Stockholm: Kongl. tryckeriet. 1704. OCLC 186785897.
- Rosen, Carl (1936). Bidrag till kännedom om de händelser, som närmast föregingo svenska stormaktsväldets fall, volume I (in Swedish). Stockholm: P.A. Norstedt & Söner. OCLC 465566526.
- Schott, Sigmund (1845). Max Emanuel, prins af Würtemberg, och hans vän, Carl XII, konung i Sverige (in Swedish). Stockholm: C. A. Bagges Förlag. OCLC 487483681.
- Schreber von Schreeb, Tor (1936). Karolinska förbundets årsbok 1936: Kongl. Maij:tz Drabanter, 1695-1718: deras organisation, beväpning och mundering (in Swedish). Stockholm: Karolinska förbundet. OCLC 470214638.
- Schreber von Schreeb, Tor (1942). Carl XII:s drabantkår: historik jämte personförteckning 1700–1721 (in Swedish). Stockholm: Linkoln Bloms Boktryckeri. OCLC 186010251.
- Schreber von Schreeb, Tor (1968). Svenska armén genom tiderna (in Swedish). Stockholm: Försvarsväsendets Intendenter Förlag. OCLC 186192188.
- Stenhammar, Waldemar (1918). Östgöta Kavalleriregemente i Karl XII:s Krig (in Swedish). Linköping: Östgöta Correspondentens Boktryckeri. OCLC 801814346.
- Tengberg, Eric (1946). Karolinska förbundets årsbok 1946: Några anteckningar kring slaget vid Poltava (in Swedish). Stockholm: Karolinska förbundet. OCLC 470214638.
- Åberg, Alf; Göransson, Göte (1976). Karoliner (in Swedish). Höganäs: Bra Böcker. ISBN 9789176901458. OCLC 251875864.
