= Nils Krister von Baumgarten =

Swedish military officer

Nils Krister von Baumgarten (1674 in Kalmar – 1727 in Stockholm) was a Swedish military officer.

He served as a "Drabant – King's loyal guard" in the Great Northern War. He participated in the Landing on Humlebæk, the battle of Narva, Duna, Klissow, Pultusk, Thorn, Lemberg, Fraustadt and Stresow where he gave his horse to Charles XII, king of Sweden, after the previous one got shot. Right after he was appointed Colonel of Adelsfanan. He followed Charles to Norway and later, after the Swedish king's death, he stayed away from the military. In total he had fought in eighteen battles and was wounded five times.

== Sources ==
- Nils Krister von Baumgarten
