= Trabant (military) =

Name for a medieval attendant

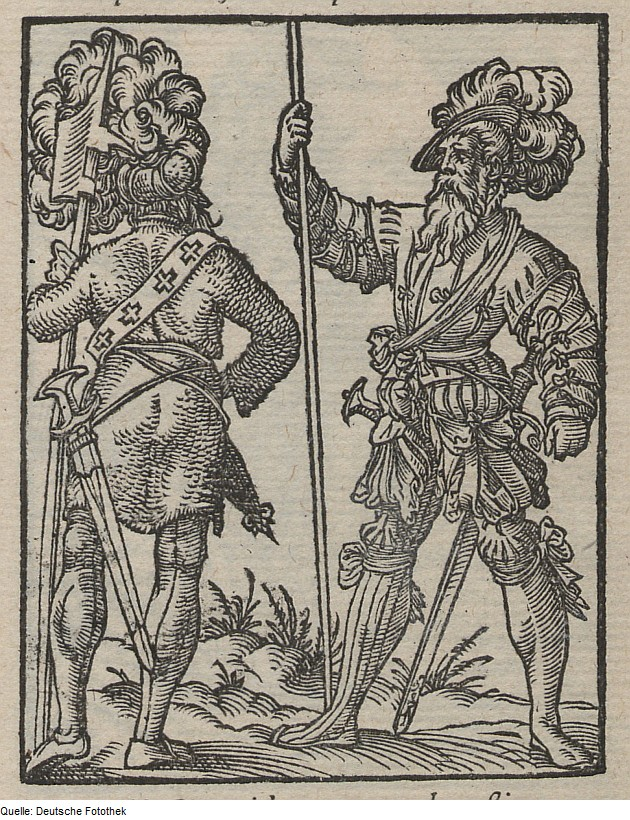
German trabants from 1568

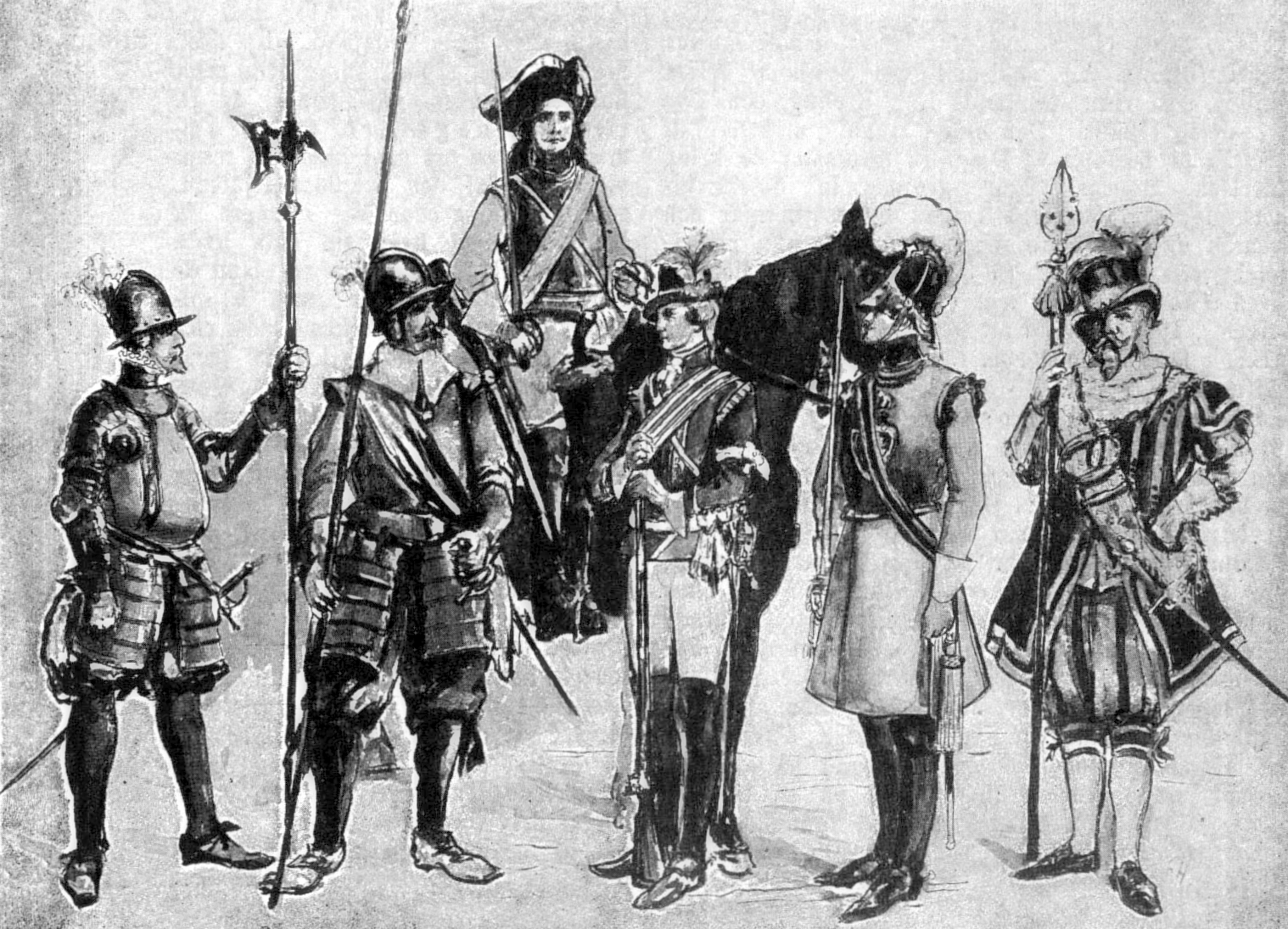
Swedish trabants, 1560-1844

A trabant (Ital. trabanti, from the German traben, Lat.: satellites) was a historical name for an attendant or a lifeguard, especially in the Middle Ages, who usually travelled on foot (as opposed to horseback). The role of a trabant was to protect a member of the aristocracy, a senior official or a senior Landsknecht officer, or to carry out their orders. For a long time it was customary for them to dress in short white hose and a waistcoat in the Spanish style. In earlier times they were armed with a halberd and a dagger. Later they were also used as cavalry.

The trabant guards frequently formed the core of Household Divisions or, as in Brandenburg, field troops as well. The Gardes du Corps were formed from the 2 companies of trabants serving Frederick William, Elector of Brandenburg, who fought with him in 1675 at the Battle of Fehrbellin.

In the order of battle in 1682 for the newly created Royal Saxon Army there were 172 horses listed in the Trabant Horse Guards (Trabanten-Leibgarde zu Roß) as well as 65 men in the Trabant Foot Guards (Leibgarde der Fuß-Trabanten).

In 1521, the Swedish nobleman Gustav Eriksson enrolled personal body guards from Dalarna that followed him in the liberation war. When he was crowned King Gustav I in 1523, the corps were formalised as the Drabant Corps – Life Guards and sentry postings at the Royal castle.

Charles XII of Sweden made himself the captain over the reformed Drabant Corps in 1700, which had a lot of initial success in the Great Northern War. In 1701, the Saxon Gardes du Corps was formed out of the Saxon trabants. This Saxon regiment met its end in the 1812 French invasion of Russia under Napoleon. In the endless march on Moscow and the subsequent retreat, almost all the trabants lost their lives. The Elector did not reinstate this guards regiment.

== Literature ==
- Johannes Anton Larraß: Geschichte des Königlich Sächsischen 6. Infanterie-Regiments Nr 105 und seine Vorgeschichte 1701 bis 1887. Druck: H. L. Kayser, Strassburg i. E., 1887.
- Sachsens-Militär-Vereinskalender Jahrgang 1915, Buchdruckerei Der Kamarad, Hrsg. F.L. Staub, Dresden (1914)
