= Battle of Stresow =

Battle during the Great Northern War, 1715

Coordinates: 54.3528°N 13.5734°E

- Part of the Great Northern War
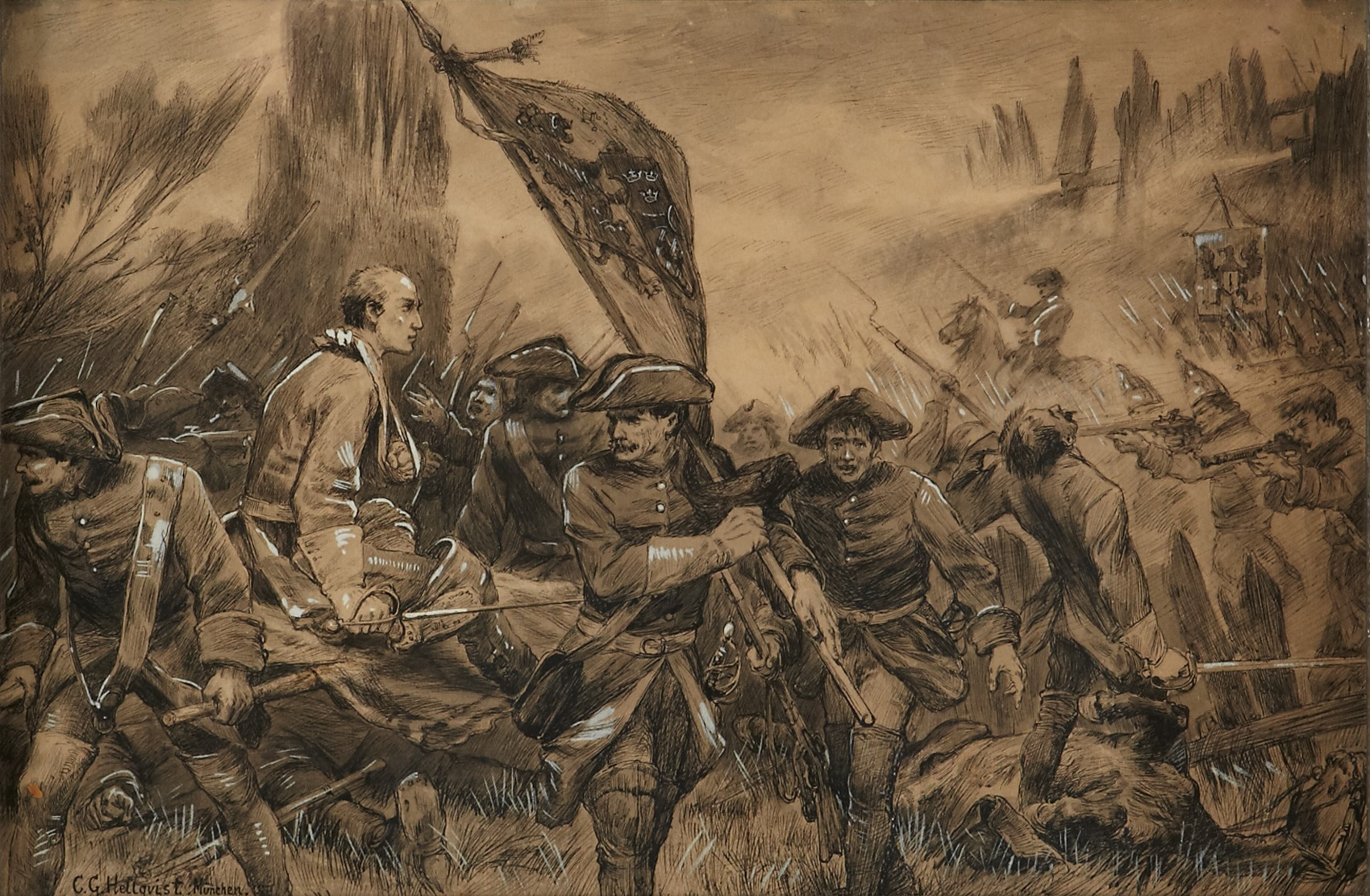
- Charles XII being carried away from the battle of Stresow after having suffered a bullet wound to his chest.
Date	5 November 1715 (O.S.); 16 November 1715 (N.S.)
Location	Stresow, Swedish Pomerania (present-day Putbus, Germany)
Result	Coalition victory

Belligerents
Swedish Empire	Kingdom of Prussia; Denmark–Norway; Electorate of Saxony

Commanders and leaders
(Swedish Empire) Charles XII of Sweden (WIA)	(Kingdom of Prussia) Leopold of Anhalt-Dessau

Strength
2,000 men 8 artillery pieces	11,500 men 26 artillery pieces

Casualties and losses
500 killed, wounded and captured	250 killed and wounded

The Landing on Groß Stresow by an anti-Swedish coalition Prussian, Norwegian, Danish and Saxon troops took place on 15 November 1715 on the island of Rügen during the Great Northern War. At the time, Rügen (nowadays part of Germany) was a possession of the Swedish Empire, the opponent of the coalition forces.

The landing was followed with cavalry assaults from the Swedish defences on the island, commanded by Charles XII king of Sweden who despite the huge numerical disadvantage of - one up against five - chose to attack the fortified camp. The Swedes managed to get past the "Cheval de frise" and break through, but were then rapidly repulsed and routed after taking heavy casualties.

The attack was supposed to work like a needle-manoeuvre: "concentrate the full attack at one point, break through and then destroy the defences from the inside", used by the Swedes fifteen years earlier in the battle of Narva, where they were greatly successful and victorious. The battle had lasted for almost an hour and Charles suffered a bullet wound to his chest, while his horse was shot and killed. Nils Krister von Baumgarten gave his horse to Charles XII, thus allowing the Swedish king to get away. (Note: Baumgarten was later appointed Colonel of "Adelsfanan" by Charles.)

About five hundred Swedes were either dead or wounded along with all their artillery captured. The allied casualties were: 43 dead and 121 wounded Danes 36 Saxons and 49 Prussians dead or wounded.

This was probably the first notable Swedish field-battle defeat led directly by Charles XII. (Note: Although Charles was present at the Battle of Poltava, a bullet wound he received to his foot before the battle prevented him from fully commanding his troops; so instead, overall command of the Swedish army was given to Carl Gustav Rehnskiöld.) With the landing secured the alliance continued fighting off the last remaining Swedes on the island of Rügen and later joined up with the troops laying siege to Stralsund. After the battle, Charles purportedly said: "Is there no god beside me?".
