= Karolinska förbundet =

Swedish learned society

Karolinska förbundet is a Swedish learned society for the study of the Caroline era in Swedish history, i.e. the rule of kings Charles X, Charles XI and Charles XII, 1654–1718.

The society was founded in 1910, with the purpose of "through furthering of scholarly research deepen and broaden the knowledge of the Caroline era, in particular the time of Charles XII, and awaken a more vivid interest in the Swedish people for the period" (as quoted in a contemporaneous article in the Swedish encyclopedia Nordisk familjebok). The first chairman of the society was Prince Carl, Duke of Västergötland (1861–1951).

The main achievement is the publication of the yearbook, the Karolinska Förbundets Årsbok (KFÅ), which has been published continually since the foundation in 1910. The first editor (1910–1922) of the yearbook was the historian Professor Arthur Stille, succeeded by Professor Nils Herlitz.

Some articles in the early volumes of the society yearbook show a nationalist and militarist bias typical of the period. Although many articles for obvious reasons still focus on military history, there is today a larger number of articles on the social history of the period. In this respect the society is similar to another Swedish society devoted to the study of the time period of a certain monarch, the Carl Johans-förbundet.
