= Siege of Thorn (1703) =

Siege of the Great Northern War

- Part of the Great Northern War
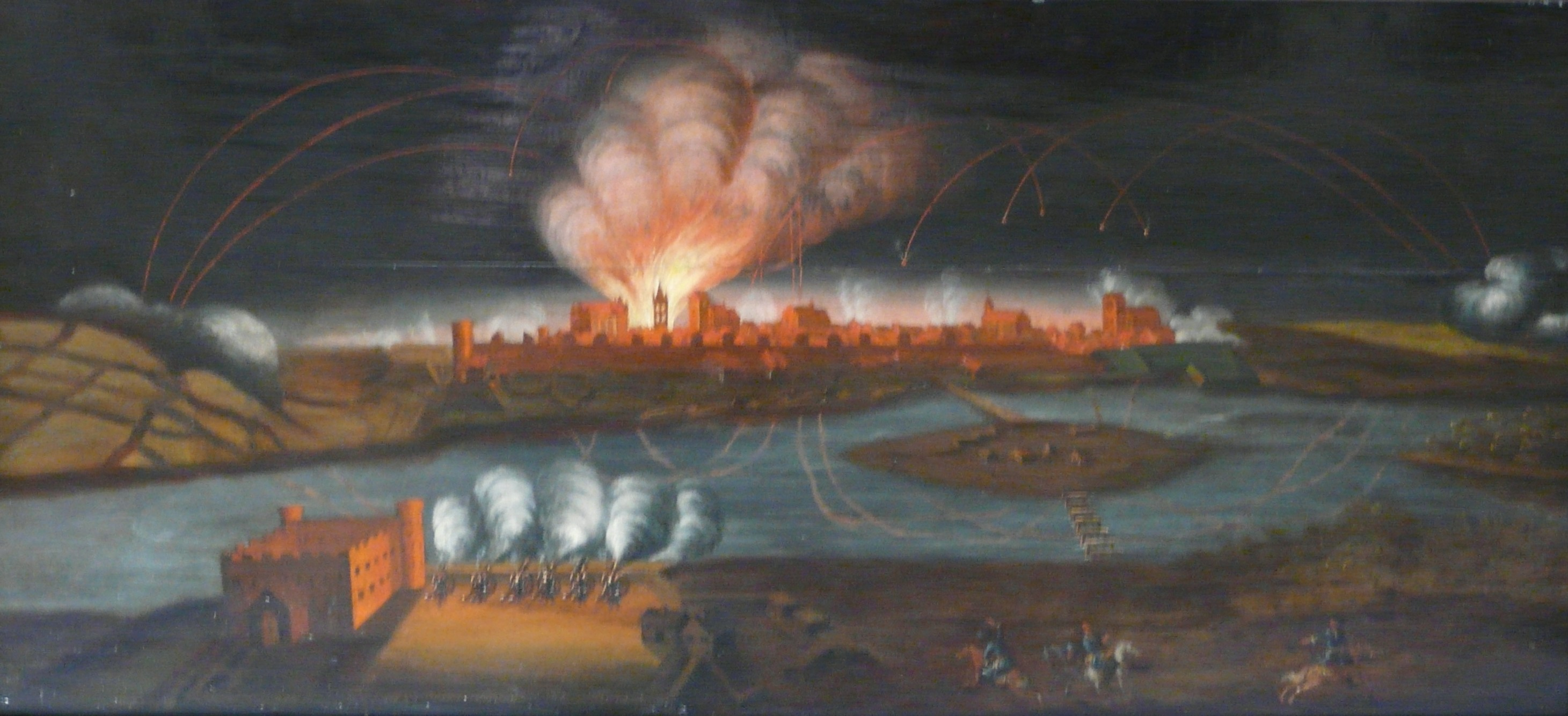
- Siege of Thorn, 1703
Date	26 May – 14 October 1703 (N.S.?)
Location	Toruń, Poland 53°01′00″N 18°37′00″E
Result	Swedish victory
Territorial changes	Thorn surrenders to the Swedes

Belligerents
Swedish Empire	Electorate of Saxony

Commanders and leaders
(Swedish Empire) Charles XII	(Electorate of Saxony) von Kanitz (surrendered)

Strength
26,000 men	6,000 men

Casualties and losses
40 dead 70 wounded	1,000 dead 4,860 captured
- Location within Kuyavian-Pomeranian Voivodeship Siege of Thorn (1703) (Poland)

The siege of Thorn was set during the Great Northern War, between Sweden and Saxony from 26 May – 14 October 1703 (N.S.?). The Swedish army was commanded by Charles XII of Sweden and the Saxon by General von Kanitz. The siege ended with a victory for Sweden, and the whole garrison surrendered to the Swedes. Following the capture of Thorn, the city was forced to pay some 100,000 reichsthaler.

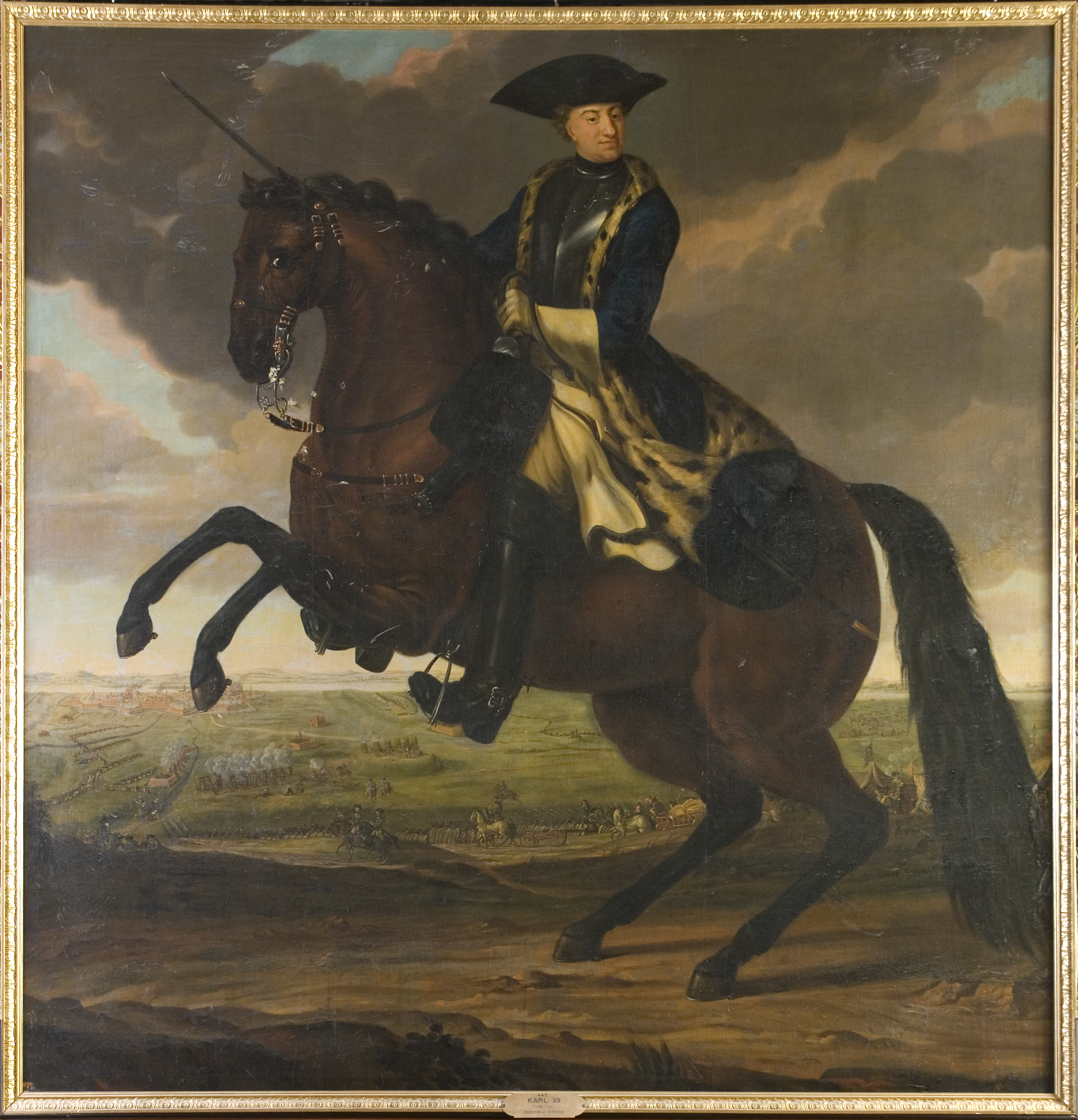
Charles XII at the Siege of Thorn
