= Northern War in Ukraine =

- Part of the Russo-Ukrainian Wars and the Great Northern War
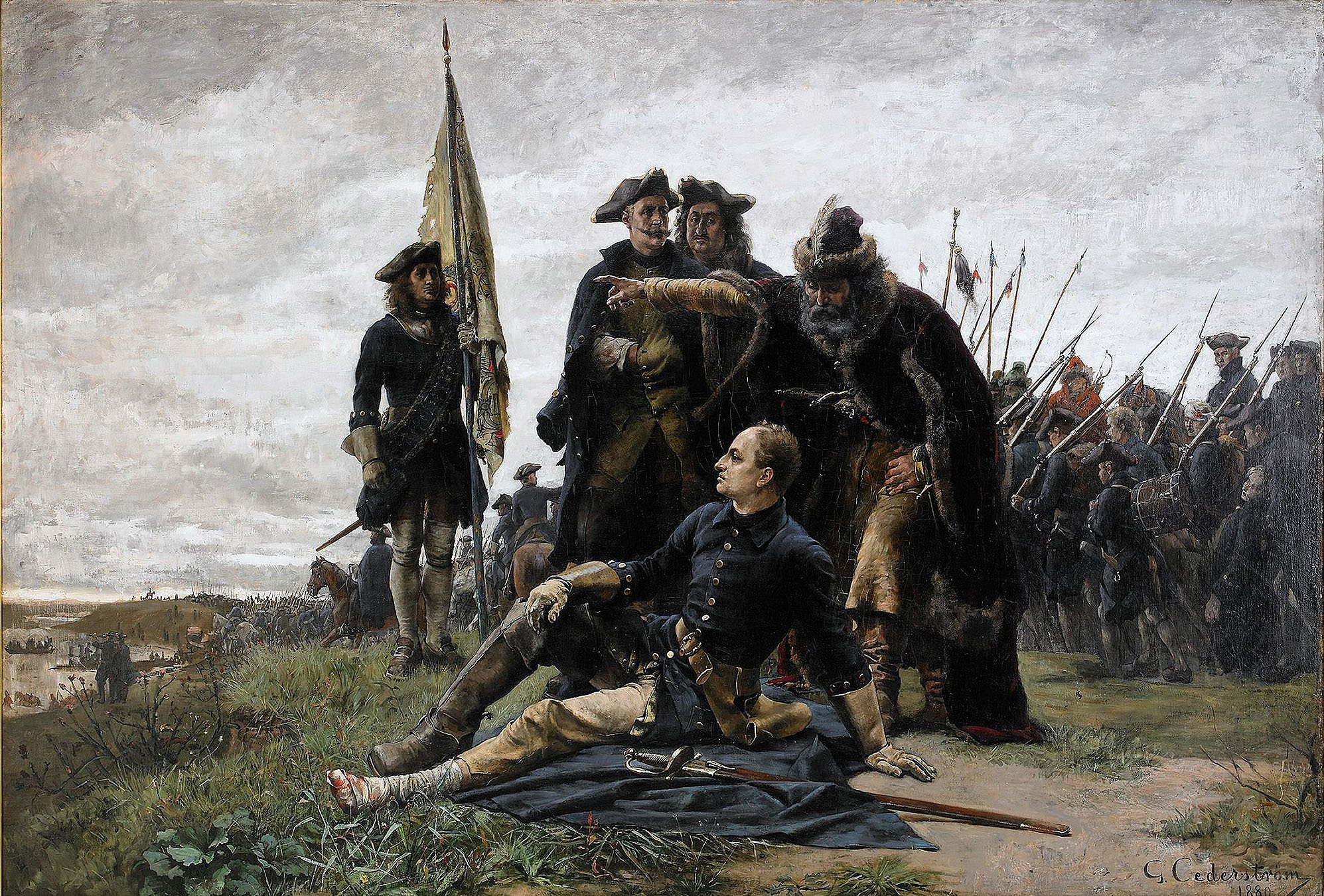
- Charles XII and Mazepa at the river Dnipro after the Battle of Poltava. Gustaf Cederström (1880).
Date	1700–1713
Location	Ukraine
Result	Paliy uprising: Polish victory; Bulavin Rebellion: Russian victory; 1708–1709: Russian victory; 1710–1713: Ottoman victory
Territorial changes	Left-bank Hetmanate and Zaporizhian Sich lose their independence to Russia.; Definitive abolition of Cossack Regiments in the Commonwealth, erasing the Right-bank Hetmanate.; Zaporizhian Cossacks establish the Kamianka Sich and Oleshky Sich within Crimean territory.

Belligerents
(yes) Swedish Empire; Ottoman Empire; Polish–Lithuanian Commonwealth (Leszczyński's faction); Cossack Hetmanate loyal to Charles XII	Tsardom of Russia; Cossack Hetmanate loyal to Peter І

Commanders and leaders
(Swedish Empire) Charles XII; Stanisław Leszczyński; Ahmed III; Ivan Mazepa # Pylyp Orlyk	(Russia) Peter І Ivan Skoropadsky

The Northern War in Ukraine (1700–1713) was a theatre of the Great Northern War, featuring factions including the Left-bank Cossack Hetmanate under Ivan Mazepa, Right-bank Cossacks under the Polish–Lithuanian Commonwealth, the Zaporizhian Sich, the Tsardom of Russia, the Swedish Empire, the Crimean Khanate, and the Ottoman Empire.

== Overview ==
Paliy uprising of the Right-bank Cossacks Bulavin Rebellion of the Don Cossacks Mazepa's Western Ukraine campaign 1705 Poltava campaign Zaporizhian Cossacks/Chortomlyk Sich campaign 1709 Sapieha's Volhynian campaign 1709 Russo-Turkish War (1710–1713) Timeline of the Northern War in Ukraine: Autumn 1700 – Paliy's Cossack rebels capture Fastiv; August 1702 – Pereiaslav Regiment mutiny repressed; October 1702 – Battle of Berdychiv; 4 Febr. N.S. 1703 – Battle of Verbka (near Letychiv); 20 Febr. 1703 N.S. – Battle of Ladyzhyn; 1705 – Bulavin Rebellion began in Bakhmut; Autumn 1705 – Mazepa conquers Western Ukraine; 20 Oct. 1707 N.S. – Battle of Shulhynka; 7 Feb. 1708 N.S – Battle of Grodno (1708); 13 July 1708 N.S. – Battle of Kryva Luka; 14 July 1708 N.S. – Battle of Holowczyn; 10 Sept. 1708 N.S. – Battle of Malatitze; 20 Sept. 1708 N.S. – Battle of Rajovka; 9 Oct. 1708 N.S. – Battle of Lesnaya; 8 Nov. 1708 N.S. – Mazepa joins Charles XII in Novhorod-Siverskyi; 11–13 Nov. 1708 N.S. – Battle of the Desna; 13 Nov. 1708 N.S. – Sack of Baturyn (siege began 7 Nov. N.S.); 12 Nov. 1708 N.S. – Executions of Cossacks in Lebedyn began; 21 Nov. 1708 N.S. – Battle of Koniecpol (Poland); 30 Nov. 1708 N.S. – Battle and sack of Smile (Сміле); 29 Dec. 1708 N.S. – Sack of Romny; 3–10 Jan. 1709 N.S. – Siege of Vepryk; 8 Feb. 1709 N.S. – Battle of Opishnia; 19 Feb. 1709 N.S. – Battle of Khukra; 21 Feb. 1709 N.S. – Battle of Krasnokutsk–Gorodnoye; 6 April 1709 N.S. – Battle of Tsarychanka; 12 April 1709 N.S. – Battle of Liakhivtsi (Bilohiria); 18 April 1709 N.S. – Siege of Poltava began; 23 April 1709 N.S. – Battle of Sokilka; 27 April 1709 N.S. – Sack of Keleberda; 29 April 1709 N.S. – Sack of Perevolochna; 11 May 1709 N.S. – Sack of New Kodak; 11 May 1709 N.S. – Sack of Old Kodak; 24 May 1709 N.S. – Battle of Lidykhiv (or Nakvasha); 25 May 1709 N.S. – Destruction of the Chortomlyk Sich; 25 June 1709 N.S. – Battle of Stary Sanzhary; 8 July 1709 N.S. – Battle of Poltava; 11 July 1709 N.S. – Surrender at Perevolochna; Feb. 1711 N.S. – Crimean raid on Sloboda Ukraine; 22 Feb. 1711 N.S. – Pylyp Orlyk's March on Right-bank Ukraine; Early March 1711 N.S. – Battle of Lysianka; 5–7 April 1711 N.S. – Orlyk's Siege of Bila Tserkva; June–July 1711 N.S. – Pruth River Campaign; 30 May – 24 July 1711 – Crimean campaign (1711); 3 July – 6 Sept. 1711 – Kuban campaign (1711); 12 Feb. 1713 N.S. – Skirmish at Bender: Charles XII forced back to Sweden

Well before the Swedish army entered Ukraine in 1708, there were widespread rebellions in both Western Ukraine (the Paliy uprising of 1700/1702–1704 against the Commonwealth for abolishing the Right-bank Cossack Regiments in 1699) and Eastern Ukraine (the Bulavin Rebellion of Don Cossacks of 1705/1707–1708 against the Tsardom of Russia).

Moreover, since the beginning of the Great Northern War in 1700, the Cossack Hetmanate had been supplying the Tsardom of Russia troops, ammunition, fodder and food. Mazepa was also directly involved in suppressing Paliy uprising in Right-bank Ukraine in 1704, officially "to aid the Commonwealth against Sweden", but in practice to prevent the Cossack rebellion from spreading to Left-bank Ukraine. Paliy and his fellow Cossack rebels were very sympathetic to Mazepa, and Right-bank Hetman Samiilo Samus even offered him his mace, but Mazepa refused to prevent war between the Commonwealth and Russia. In practice, however, the Right-bank Regiments were added to the Left-bank Cossack Hetmanate for several years, leading to a temporary reunification of Ukraine. While Paliy was exiled to Siberia in 1705, Samus and the other Cossack rebel leaders pledged their loyalty to Mazepa, and Cossacks from both banks would fight side by side in the campaign to drive the Polish gentry out of Western Ukraine up to and including Lviv in late 1705.

With the arrival of Charles XII in Ukraine in October 1708, Mazepa concluded the Ukrainian-Swedish Alliance with the King and opposed Peter I. Following the Hetman, the Zaporizhian Cossacks led by Kish otaman Kost Hordiienko also joined the Swedes. After the Baturyn tragedy and the Battle of Poltava, the Ukrainian Cossacks withdrew together with Mazepa and Charles XII to Bender, Moldova in the Ottoman Empire. As the sultan refused Peter's demand to extradite the Swedish king to Russia, which violated Ottoman territory, Istanbul declared war on Russia in 1710.

After Mazepa's death, Pylyp Orlyk was elected as hetman of Ukraine in April 1710, and he continued the fight for Ukraine's independence. In 1711 the Ukrainian Cossacks together with the Crimean Tatars launched Pylyp Orlyk's March on Right-bank Ukraine. However, because the Crimean khan retreated earlier than planned and Orlyk could not capture Bila Tserkva, the campaign ended in failure, and Orlyk fell back. All this time, King Charles XII and hetman Orlyk were conducting diplomatic work in the Ottoman Empire and many European capitals in order to organize an anti-Moscow coalition. However, these efforts were unsuccessful. Muscovy managed to avoid any large-scale military action by the Ottoman Empire through diplomatic efforts and bribing of Ottoman officials. Another peace treaty was signed on 17 April 1712. However, on 30 April 1713, Sultan Ahmed III declared a new war – though no significant fighting took place. During 1713, Muscovy and the Ottoman Empire finally ceased hostilities. Charles XII was forced to leave the Ottoman Empire in February 1713, and finally returned to Sweden.

== Early stages ==
=== Prelude: Paliy uprising (1700–1704) ===
Paliy uprising (also Palej uprising) was a Cossack uprising, led by colonel Semen Paliy against the Polish–Lithuanian Commonwealth in 1702–1704, with a preliminary skirmish in 1700.

=== Interlude: 1705–1706 ===
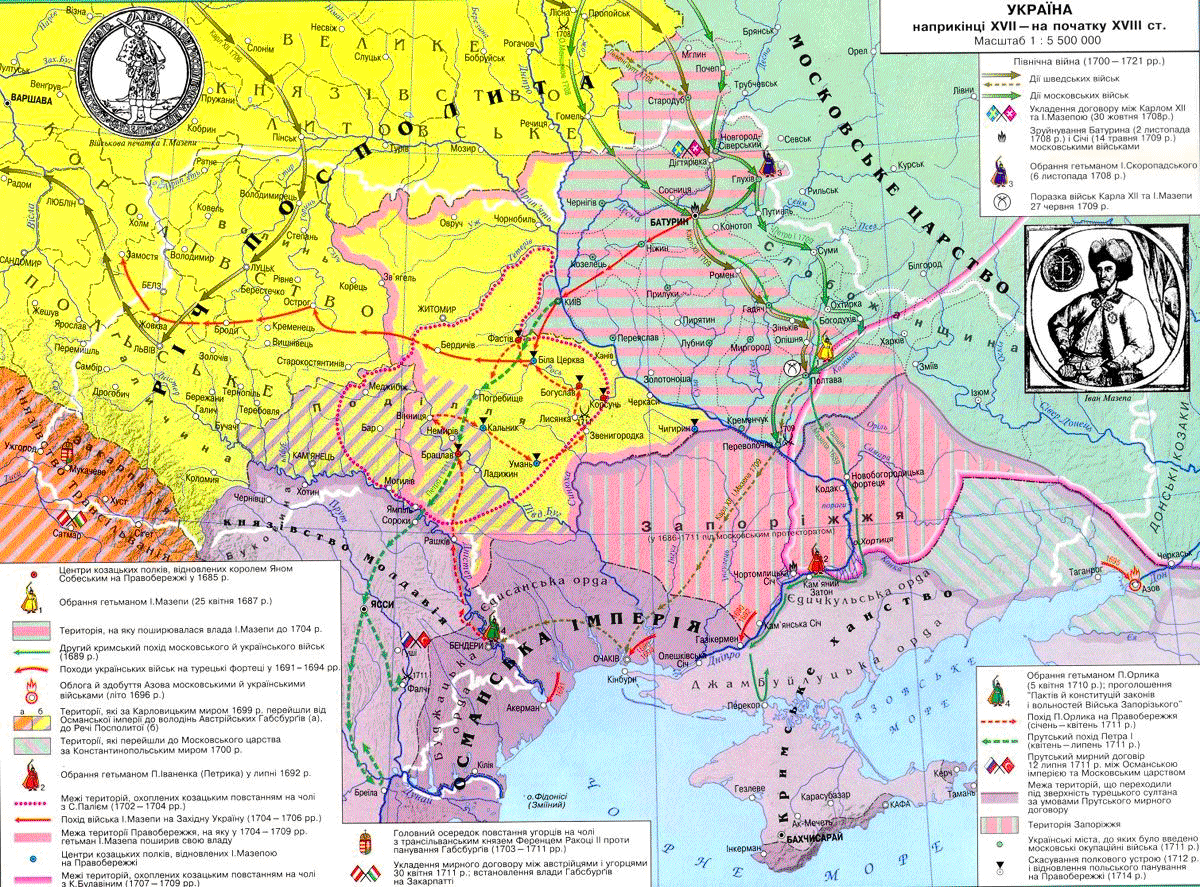
Map of Ukraine around 1700 in Ukrainian

After the start of the Russo-Swedish War, the position of the Hetmanate in the Tsardom of Russia got even more complicated. Tsar Peter I constantly demanded more and more troops, provisions and ammunition from hetman Ivan Mazepa. In addition, Ukrainian Cossacks and officers constantly complained about harassment and extortion conducted by Moscow troops. The civilian population of the Hetmanate was also subjected to looting. In April 1704, a royal order was issued for the Cossack army to fight against detachments of magnates – supporters of the Swedes. Meanwhile, starting in 1706, Mazepa corresponded with Stanislaw Lishchynski (through Princess Dolska).

In Eastern Ukraine, the prelude of the Bulavin Rebellion began when a group of rebel Don Cossacks captured the town of Bakhmut in 1705.

=== Bulavin Rebellion: 1707–1708 ===
The Bulavin Rebellion (Russian: Булавинское восстание, romanized: Bulavinskoye vosstaniye; Восстание Булавина, Vosstaniye Bulavina) was a war which took place in the years 1707 and 1708 between the Don Cossacks and the Tsardom of Russia. Kondraty Bulavin, a democratically elected Ataman of the Don Cossacks, led the Cossack rebels. The conflict was triggered by a number of underlying tensions between the Moscow government under Peter I of Russia, the Cossacks, and Russian peasants fleeing from serfdom in Russia to gain freedom in the autonomous Don area. It started with the 1707 assassination of Prince Yury Vladimirovich Dolgorukov, the leader of Imperial army's punitive expedition to the Don area, by Don Cossacks under Bulavin's command. The end of the rebellion came with Bulavin's death in 1708.

== Swedish intervention (1708–1709) ==
=== Swedish march through Belarus (February–October 1708) ===
The Battle of Grodno (Hrodna) on 7 February 1708 was a relatively small first clash, followed by the larger Battle of Holowczyn (Haloůchyn) on 14 July 1708, a costly tactical Swedish victory. The Battle of Malatitze (10 September 1708) was indecisive, but the Swedes forced the Russians to retreat. The Battle of Rajovka (20 September 1708) was a clear Swedish victory, but after the army reached Tatarsk (modern Monastyrshchinsky District) the following day, the supply convoy of Adam Ludwig Lewenhaupt had still not arrived by 25 September 1708. Charles decided it would be impossible to reach Moscow without it, and that his hungry army had to get food in fertile Ukraine instead. (Note: Alternately, Peter B. Brown (2009) asserted that Charles was "turned away at Starshii, a small town several miles southwest of the all important Smolensk, seizure of which is mandatory for any contemplation of a successful Moscow offensive." He did not mention any date, and only later mentioned "an abundance of Ukrainian foodstuffs" as the reason for Charles to change his course southwards.) Some two weeks later, the supply convoy commanded by Lewenhaupt was defeated in the Battle of Lesnaya (9 October 1708, O.S. 29 September 1708).

=== Mazepa's Cossacks join Sweden ===
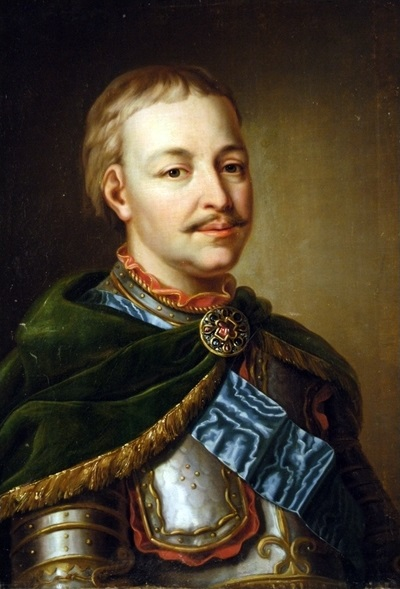
Hetman Ivan Mazepa

A Swedish detachment under the command of Lagerkrun, due to the unfamiliarity with the area, was not able to occupy Starodub, which was immediately used by the Muscovite army. After the occupation of Starodub and Pochep, Moscow's troops blocked the Swedes' last chance to get the food they needed. On 21 October 1708, the Swedish army, not reaching Smolensk, headed southwards, from Kortenichi to the northern borders of Ukraine (Starodub district, crossing the Desna river).

Meanwhile, the Hetman of the Cossack Hetmanate Ivan Mazepa had been in correspondence with the Polish allies of Charles XII to explore his options. He had been loyal to his protector Peter I for over two decades, but Moscow had been encroaching on the administrative and cultural autonomy of Ukraine. Moreover, Peter's Russian armies were retreating from all of Belarus, unable to withstand the Swedish advance, except to delay it by scorched earth tactics, wreaking destruction across the land and misery for the population. Finally, when it became clear that the army of Charles was making a detour towards Ukraine, and the tsar had refused to send the Ukrainians any help, and ordered them to burn all towns and villages in Charles' path as well, just as the Russians had done in Belarus, Mazepa refused, and changed sides at the urging of his own colonels. Peter I had sent an order to Mazepa to go to Starodub immediately and unite with general Ifland. After consulting with the colonels, hetman Mazepa decided not to go to Starodub and sent an ambassador to Charles XII with a request for protection. Hetman Mazepa and the Cossack colonels considered the tsar to have violated his duty to protect the Cossack Hetmanate, as stipulated by the Pereiaslav Agreement of 1654 and many treaties ever since; instead, Mazepa and his colonels began studying the Treaty of Hadiach again, and made diplomatic overtures to Charles as he was advancing towards Ukraine.

Having learned of the hetman's transition to the Swedes' side, Peter I ordered to capture Mazepa and sent several punitive detachments to prevent mass protests against Moscow in Ukraine, while troops led by Sheremetyev were sent to lay siege to Baturyn.

=== Arrival of the Swedes in Ukraine ===
After the defeat of the Livland Corps, the Swedes had 32,000 soldiers left (instead of the planned 40,000). They had little gunpowder and food, but Charles XII was hoping for a large arsenal and warehouses of hetman Mazepa in Baturyn.

On 23 October (3 November 1708), Mazepa was in Baturyn. However, on 24 October (4 November), having left an almost impregnable fortress, he crossed the Desna river and met with an advanced detachment of the Swedes. On 23 October (6 November) 1708, in the village of Orlovka (70 km from Baturyn), Mazepa arrived at the headquarters of Charles XII. At that time he had a personal court army, hundreds of elected Cossacks of the Pryluky, Lubny and Myrhorod regiments, several hundred Serdyuks, and three self-formed regiments led by Halahan, Kozhukhovsky and Andriy Malam. The total number of hetman's army was about 3.5-4 thousand soldiers. The rest of the personnel of the three above-mentioned Cossack regiments, led by the commanding Poltava colonel Hryhoriy Hertsyk, together with several Serdyuk regiments led by Chechel, remained in Baturyn.

Among the hetman's officers were Ivan Lomykovsky, Vasyl Chuykevych, Pylyp Orlyk, Mykhailo Hamalia, Dmytro Maksymovych, Fedir Myrovych and Ivan Sulyma. Among the colonels were Dmytro Gorlenko of Pryluky, Dmytro Zelensky of Lubny, Konstantin Mokievsky of Chyhyryn, Andriy Kandyba of Korsun, and Danylo Apostol of Myrhorod (the latter soon, together with Halagan, sided with Peter I).

On 28 October (8 November), the meeting between the Swedish king and the Ukrainian hetman took place. On 11 November, the Swedish army was trying to cross the Desna river, which was complicated by the actions of the Moscow's troops under General Hallart. On 13 November, the crossing to the west bank of the Desna was completed. Three regiments – Myrhorod, Lubny and Pryluky – refused to join the Muscovite army and were awaiting hetman Mazepa's orders.

=== Sack of Baturyn ===
Reconstructed Baturyn Fortress Citadel (pictured 2021)

Meanwhile, the siege of Baturyn had begun on 27 October O.S. (7 November N.S.). A. Menshikov had 30,000 soldiers and 20 cannons near Baturyn, and the commander of the fortress, colonel Dmytro Chechel, had 10,000 Cossacks and 40 cannons. The city was well protected, with significant supplies of weapons and food. It could withstand a long siege while waiting for the troops of the hetman and the Swedish king. However, due to the betrayal of captain Ivan Nos, the fortress fell on 2 November O.S. (13 November N.S.). All its defenders were executed, and large stocks of weapons fell to the Muscovites.

After the seizure and burning of Baturyn, Peter I sent 30,000 troops to the Zaporozhian Sich. Colonel Ivan Skoropadsky, who had initially sided with Mazepa, surrendered Starodub without a fight and joined Peter I.

Baturyn's seizure had another consequence: unrest started among the Cossacks. Peter I sent universals to all Ukrainian cities, branding Mazepa a traitor and encouraging people to rebel against the Swedish invaders. Many of those Cossacks and colonels who first followed Mazepa, left the Swedish camp and took a wait-and-see attitude.

Moscow's troops had also captured Bila Tserkva in mid-November, which housed hetman's treasury and other warehouses. The Moscow tsar ordered the execution of all supporters of the hetman, punitive detachments were sent throughout Ukraine.

=== Actions of the Swedish-Ukrainian allies (late 1708 – early 1709) ===
Poltava campaign map from Ponurivka to Perevolochna by Mykhailo Hrushevsky (1921).

On 22 November 1708, the Swedish army and Mazepa's troops approached Baturyn, but saw only ruins and fire. The allied army encamped in Romny. Here they received information about the intentions of the King of the Rzeczpospolita Stanislaus to come to their aid, and the promises of the Ottomans to sell the necessary amount of gunpowder, ammunition and lead to the Swedes.

Meanwhile, Moscow troops marched towards Hadiach, and the Swedish king was forced to direct the main convoy there to aid his troops. However, severe frosts hit in December, and as Stanislaw Poniatowski wrote: "Before reaching Hadyach, the Swedes lost more than 3,000 soldiers frozen to death, many horses and support staff in carts."

On 22 December 1708 (2 January 1709), the Swedish king left the captured Hadiach and headed back to Romny. During the winter of 1709, local battles took place near Vepryk, Lokhvytsia, Krasnokutsk, Oleshnia, etc.

By the spring of 1709, the Swedish soldiers was exhausted by severe winter frosts and constant local clashes with the Moscow army. Charles XII planned to move to Kharkiv, and then to Moscow, but the weather intervened again. Spring floods and thaws washed away the roads and made it impossible for the Swedish army to cross. Due to the damaged roads, the Swedes lost almost their entire convoy. When they reached Kolomak, the allies stopped and were forced to retreat to Opishnia, and on March 2 (13) to Budyshchy. During the campaign in Sloboda Ukraine, the Swedes destroyed and looted villages and towns: Kolomak, Kotelva, Krasnokutsk, Horodne and others among them, but in the battle near Horodne the army were defeated, and Charles himself had barely escaped captivity.

During the winter, the Swedish army got significantly reduced in numbers. Poltava was not captured – its garrison, consisting of Moscow soldiers and local Cossacks, repelled all attacks. In addition, the purchase of gunpowder from the Ottomans never took place. The military aid expected by Charles from the Tatars and Ottomans did not arrive as well. This was due to the fact that Peter I met with Kapaji Pasha, the unofficial representative of the Ottoman sultan in the Crimean Khanate, in Azov and gave him a large sum of money; captured Muslims were also released. Around the same time in Constantinople, during a meeting between Moscow ambassador P. Tolstoy and Grand Vizier Cherlyul Ali Pasha, the ambassador also presented the Vizier with generous gifts from the Moscow tsar. Meanwhile, the "rumors" about Charles XII planning to make peace with Peter and marry his sister Sophia reached Sultan Ahmed III. After all this, Sultan Ahmed III forbade the Crimean Khan Devlet-Girey to "fight the Muscovites" and took a neutral position.

=== Zaporizhian Cossacks join Sweden (March–April 1709) ===
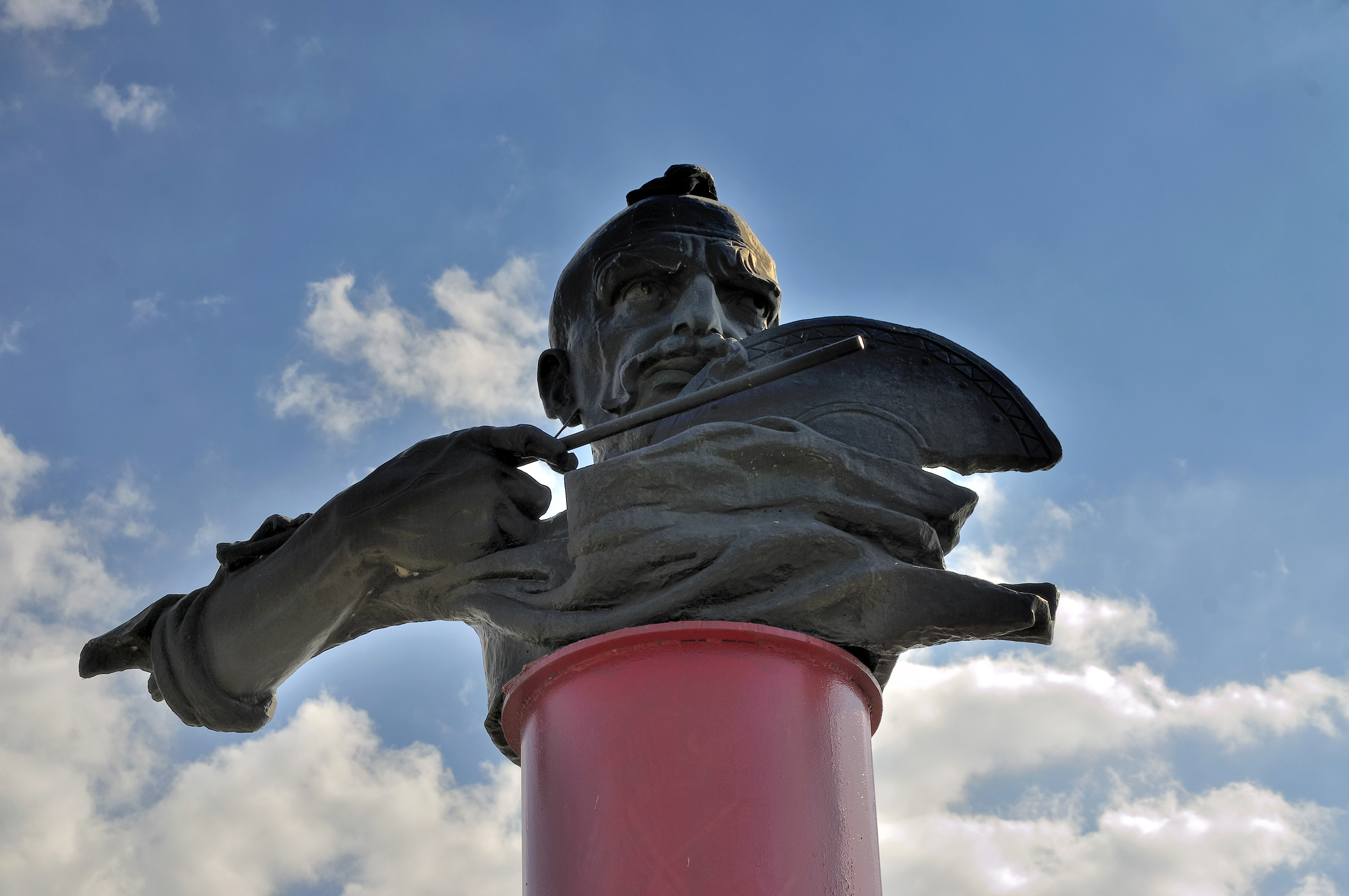
Monument for the Zaporizhian Cossack otaman Kost Hordiienko at the Kamianka Sich (photo 2014)

While the Tatars and the Poles were in no hurry to help the Swedes, in March 1709, Mazepa managed to convince the Zaporizhian Cossacks, led by Kish otaman Kost Hordiienko of the Chortomlyk Sich, to join him in supporting the Swedish side against Russia. At the end of March 1709, Hordiienko with 8,000 Cossacks swore allegiance to Charles XII and hetman Mazepa. The Hetman, in turn, allocated 60 thousand thalers from his own treasury for the needs of the army.

Hordiienko's Cossacks opposed the three Moscow regiments under the command of Colonel Campbell. They defeated the Russian forces at the Battle of Tsarychanka (1709) on 6 April 1709. Out of revenge, the Russians destroyed the Chortomlyk Sich on 25 May 1709. The Zaporizhian Cossacks would establish the new Kamianka Sich shortly thereafter.

The Battle of Sokilka (23 April) on the Vorskla between the Swedes and Muscovites (and Cossack units fighting on both sides) remained inconclusive.

=== Siege and battle of Poltava (April–July 1708) ===
1895 map of the Poltava campaign from Baturyn to Perevolochna

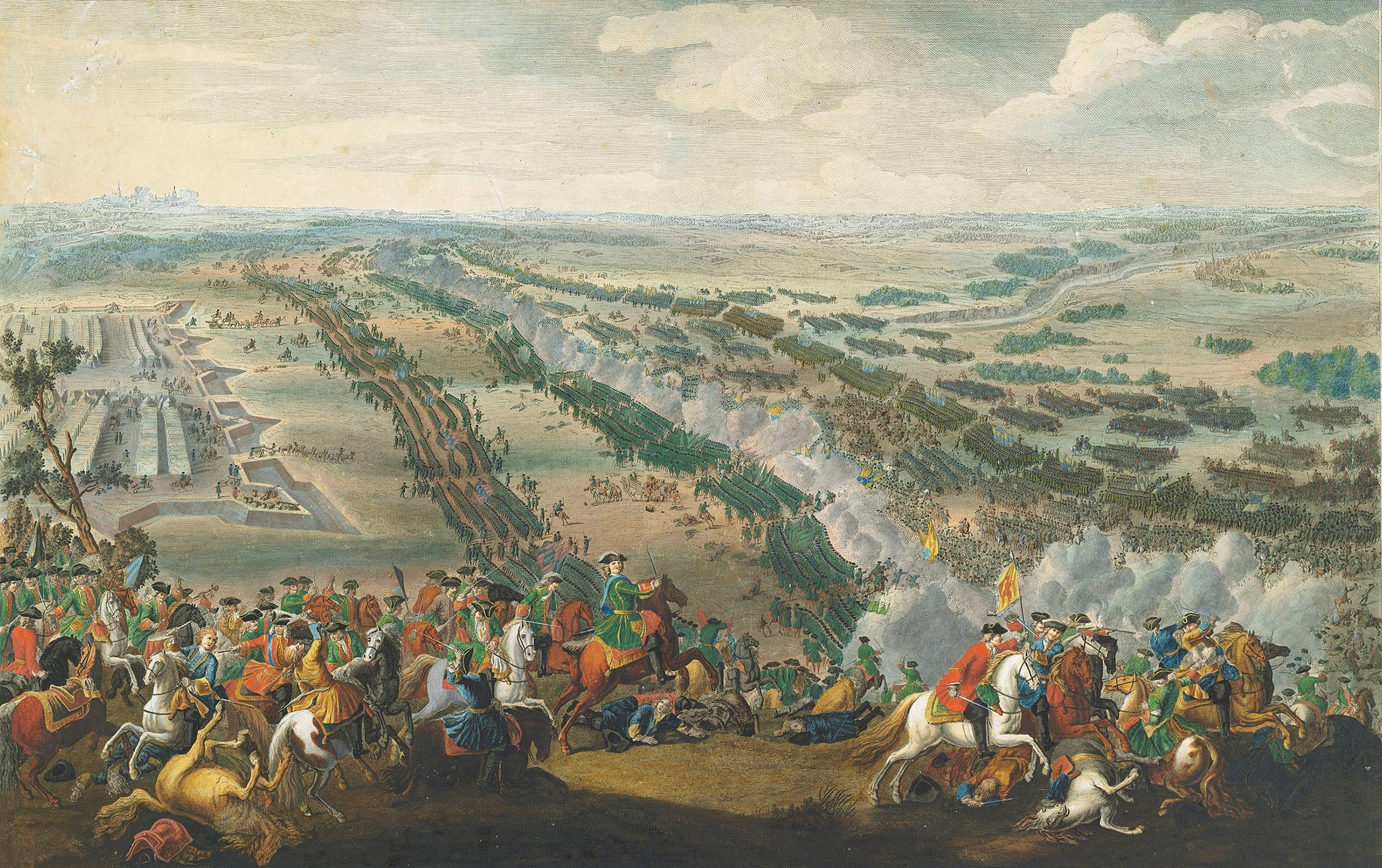
The Battle of Poltava by Pierre-Denis Martin

The Siege of Poltava began on 7 April 1709 at the recommendation of Mazepa to Charles: this city in the southern Cossack Hetmanate was essential to capture. When a storming failed, Charles began besieging and bombarding the city in an attempt to force its capitulation.

During April 1709, Swedish regiments came close to Poltava. Charles XII decided to besiege the town and wait for a decisive battle with Peter I there. On 24 April, the first attempt to storm the fortress took place. About 3,000 Swedish soldiers attacked, but the assault failed due to the lack of gunpowder and guns.

On 11 May, the full siege of the Poltava fortress began. There were 30 cannons and 4.5 thousand Moscow garrison soldiers in Poltava at that time.

Meanwhile, the Allies were dealt with another major blow. Tsar Peter sent a combined detachment of infantry of prince D. Golitsyn and the cavalry of H. Holtz to the borders of the Rzeczpospolita. Near the town of Pidkamen, Moscow troops crossed the path of King Stanislaw's army – without the help of von Krassow's troops it was defeated and the King was forced to flee to Warsaw. Two days before the Battle of Poltava, General H. Holtz defeated another Swedish ally – the detachment of voivode Sapiga.

Near Poltava, the Swedes had 4 cannons and not enough gunpowder even for rifles. The Moscow army had 72 cannons (including 40 which they got in Baturyn) and plenty of gunpowder, weapons and ammunition.

Meanwhile, Tsar Peter, having gathered a large enough army, advanced to Vorskla. The troops used deceptive maneuvers changing the direction of advance. On 16 June (27 June) 1709, Charles XII was severely wounded by an accidental bullet near the village Nyzhni Mlyny. The wound caused illness and the king fell ill with a high fever.

The Battle of Poltava started on 27 June (8 July). The Swedish army entered the battle with 19,700 soldiers. 6,900 Swedes were killed in the battle, 2,800 were taken prisoner. The losses of the Moscow army are estimated at approx. 1,500 soldiers. It is not known exactly how many Ukrainians died and how many were taken prisoner as Moscow troops treated Ukrainians as "traitors", tortured and executed them. It is known that after the Battle of Poltava approx. 20,000 people (including 16,000 Swedes, as well as Cossacks, civilians, Cossacks with families and children) retreated with Mazepa.

=== Retreat to the south (late 1709) ===
In total, approx. 16,000 Swedes retreated in the Swedish-Ukrainian convoy from Poltava. They were pursued by a 12,000-strong Moscow army under the command of M. Golitsyn and R. Bager. They were later accompanied by six regiments of A. Menshikov.

Arriving at Perevolochna, the Swedes realized that, after its capture and destruction by Moscow troops, it was impossible to cross there. However, Charles XII, Ivan Mazepa, some of the officers and the wounded (a total of 1,300 Swedes and 1,500 Ukrainians) managed to get to the other side. Meanwhile, Moscow troops approached and surrounded the Swedish camp.

On 30 June (11 July) 1709 the besieged 16,000-strong Swedish army surrendered at the mercy of Moscow's troops. The Swedes were arrested and sent deep into Muscovy. Many of them died before the end of the war, many mercenaries who served in the Swedish army went to serve Peter I.

On 17 July, the Swedish-Ukrainian convoy reached the Buh and the crossing to Ochakovo began. However, it was rather slow. On 20 July, prince Volkonsky's Moscow troops approached the camp, captured approx. 300 Swedes and killed more than 500 Ukrainian Cossacks.

On 1 August Charles XII, Mazepa and the remains of the convoy moved from Ochakovo to Bendery. Through diplomatic efforts, the Swedish king tried to organize an anti-Moscow alliance with the Ottoman Empire, the Rzeczpospolita and other European countries. However, the Allies were in no hurry to act against Moscow. Meanwhile, Peter I organized an anti-Swedish alliance with Denmark and King Stanislaw, who supported the Swedes, was removed from power in the Rzeczpospolita.

Charles and Mazepa found themselves trapped in Bendery as their way to the Rzeczpospolita was blocked by Moscow troops stationed near Chernivtsi.

Hetman Ivan Mazepa died on 21 September (2 October), 1709. The Cossacks elected the general secretary Pylyp Orlyk as the new hetman, and he continued Mazepa's work to liberate Ukraine.

== Russo-Turkish War (1710–1713) ==
Pylyp Orlyk's March on Right-bank Ukraine in 1711

The anti-Moscow coalition was not forming as quickly as the Allies had hoped. It was not until 20 November (1 December) 1710, that the Ottoman Empire declared war on the Muscovy. The Ottoman army led by Grand Vizier Numan Pasha started the campaign, but the troops moved very slowly, and reached the Danube river only in mid-June 1711.

In January 1711, Hetman Pylyp Orlyk began a military campaign in Right-bank Ukraine with the support of the Tatars of the Crimean Khan Devlet-Girey. The Ukrainian-Tatar army reached Bila Tserkva. Initially, the local population supported Orlyk's army. However, later, the Tatars, violating the agreement, began looting and taking yasir – prisoners. At the same time, the Moscow army launched an offensive, and drove Orlyk into the Ottoman territory.

On 11 November (31 October), 1712, the Ottoman Empire declared war on Peter I again but no active hostilities took place. In early 1713 Charles XII left Bendery and returned to Sweden in 1714.

== Aftermath ==
The Treaty of Nystad was concluded in 1721, according to which the Swedish prisoners returned home.

== Consequences of the war ==
As a result of the war, Muscovy turned into Russia, and began to get rid of its old enemy, a powerful neighbor who was blocking the access to the Baltic Sea. At the same time, the Battle of Poltava was a colossal disaster not only for Sweden but for entire Europe; it broke the former balance of strength. After the Battle of Poltava, the hegemony in the Baltic region was transferred from Sweden to Russia, and started to accumulate there.

The Ukrainian lands in the Russian Empire, 1740–1750, superimposed on modern Ukraine's territory. Cossack Hetmanate, centred in Hlukhiv (Глухів) Zaporizhzhian Sich, centred on Nova Sich (Нова Січ) Sloboda Ukraine, centred in Kharkiv (Харків) The remaining Western parts were mostly in the Polish–Lithuanian Commonwealth, while the south encompassed Yedisan (Ottoman Ukraine) and the Crimean Khanate.

The war had a significantly negative impact on Ukraine in socio-economic, political and cultural terms. While it largely avoided the Great Northern War plague outbreak in other regions of Europe, many parts of the country were devastated by years of fighting, plundering and upheaval. While The Ruin of the late 17th century had mostly devastated the Right Bank, the Northern War of the early 18th century mostly saw towns and fortresses sacked or razed by many factions on the Left Bank, in Sloboda Ukraine, and the Zaporizhian Sich at Chortomlyk itself. Shortly thereafter, the Zaporizhian Cossacks established the Kamianka Sich (1709) and the Oleshky Sich (1711) within Crimean territory at the invitation of the Crimean Tatar Khan, who pledged to protect them from the Muscovites.

The Left-bank Cossacks, who had effectively administered Right-bank Ukraine upon Mazepa's repression of the Paliy uprising in 1704, handed back control to the Commonwealth after the Poltava campaign. The Right-bank Regiments, which Paliy had re-established in 1702, were definitely abolished by the Commonwealth in 1712, clearing up the last remnants of the Right-bank Hetmanate. Many of the last Registered Cossacks transferred to the Left Bank by a Russo-Polish treaty.

Meanwhile, the Tsar took heavily repressive measures against the Left-bank Cossack Hetmanate and the Zaporizhian Sich, which under Mazepa and Hordiienko had dared to act independently and even fought a war against Moscow together with Sweden. The Sack of Baturyn, the Destruction of the Chortomlyk Sich and the Executions of Cossacks in Lebedyn personally ordered by the Tsar a transition from Eastern Ukraine as vassals to colonies of Moscow. These two semi-independent Ukrainian states lost even more of their autonomy to Russia in subsequent decades, being fully abolished in 1765 and 1775, respectively, while being subjected to ever heavier Russification.

== Bibliography ==
- Brown, Peter B. (2009). "Gazing Anew at Poltava: Perspectives from the Military Revolution Controversy, Comparative History, and Decision-Making Doctrines". Harvard Ukrainian Studies. 31 (1/4). [The President and Fellows of Harvard College, Harvard Ukrainian Research Institute]: 107–133. ISSN 0363-5570. JSTOR 41756499.
- Kohut, Zenon E. (2009). "Mazepa's Ukraine: Understanding Cossack Territorial Vistas". Harvard Ukrainian Studies. 31 (1/4). Harvard Ukrainian Research Institute: 1–28. ISSN 0363-5570. JSTOR 41756495.
- Plokhy, Serhii (2022). The Gates of Europe: A History of Ukraine. New York, NY: Basic Books. p. 414. ISBN 978-0-465-07394-8.
- Tairova-Yakovleva, Tatiana (2020). Ivan Mazepa and the Russian Empire (PDF). Montreal Kingston London Chicago: McGill-Queen's Press. p. 425. ISBN 978-0-2280-0309-0.
- Zhukovsky, Arkadii (1993). "Regimental system". Encyclopedia of Ukraine. Vol. 4. Canadian Institute of Ukrainian Studies.
