= Destruction of the Chortomlyk Sich =

Chortomlyk expedition of 1709 Cossack Hetmanate Zaporizhian Sich rest of modern Ukraine: 16 (27) April: Keleberda; 18 (29) April: Perevolochna; 30 April (11 May): New and Old Kodak; 14 (25) May: Chortomlyk Sich

The destruction of the Chortomlyk or Zaporizhian Sich (Note: Ukrainian: Знищення Запорізької Січі.) was a military action carried out by Tsarist Russian forces against the Ukrainian Zaporizhian Sich, specifically the Chortomlyk Sich, on 25 May 1709 N.S. (14 May 1709 O.S.) during the Poltava campaign of the Northern War in Ukraine.

It was the final event in a wider punitive expedition ordered by tsar Peter in response to the Battle of Tsarichanka (6 April 1709), in which the Zaporizhian Cossacks led by Kost Hordiienko had defeated a larger Russian army and forced it to withdraw. This marked a successful intervention by the Zaporizhian Cossacks to help the Cossack Hetmanate under Ivan Mazepa and the army of Charles XII of Sweden in their war against Russia. The tsar was determined to punish the rebellious Cossacks, and ordered an army led by colonel Peter Yakovlev to destroy the Sich and other strongholds of the Zaporizhian Cossacks on the Dnipro.

== Background ==
In late October 1708, after Hetman Ivan Mazepa, along with a portion of the Hetmanate officer corps defected to the Swedish side, the Zaporizhian Cossacks led by Kish otaman Kost Hordiienko were negotiating with Mazepa about the alliance with Sweden in November 1708. Hryhorii Bohulia, clerk of the Sich Cossacks, sent a letter with a formal response to Mazepa on 24 November 1708, as well as a personal letter dated 21 November 1708 to the clerk Samiilo Velychko, the only known letter directed addressed to the writer of the famous Velychko Chronicle.

When the Zaporizhian Cossacks joined the Cossack Hetmanate's alliance with Sweden, the tsarist government accused the entire Zaporizhian Cossack Host of treason. Upon learning of Mazepa's defection, Peter I attempted to keep the Ukrainian people and the Zaporizhians on his side, but without success. He sent envoys to the Zaporizhian Sich; the Cossacks initially received them with reserve, but when the envoys persisted, the Cossacks threatened to kill them—including Archimandrite Zhurakhovsky of the Mezhyhirya Monastery.

Following failed negotiations, the Muscovite authorities dispatched a punitive expedition to the Sich led by Colonel Petro Yakovlev, which included Hnat Halahan's company (Cossack mercenary) regiment. After capturing the ancient Cossack strongholds of Keleberda (16 April O.S.; 27 April N.S.): Perevolochna (18 April O.S.; 29 April N.S.), New and Old Kodak (30 April O.S.; 11 May N.S.), the troops advanced on the Chortomlyk Sich.

== Destruction ==
On their way to the Sich, the troops ravaged Cossack towns and villages. The town of Perevolochna, where the Vorskla flows into the Dnipro, was also devastated. The Cossack garrison stationed there was massacred, and the flotilla of Cossack boats was burnt. Meanwhile, after the Siege of Poltava had begun in April 1709, Charles XII resumed hostilities against the Muscovites in the fields around the beleagured city in mid-May 1709.

By order of the Tsarist government, the Zaporizhian Sich was to be destroyed by troops under the command of Colonel Yakovlev. The defence of the Sich was led by the acting otaman Yakym Bohush, who ordered the Cossacks to dig themselves away from the bank, after which the waters of the Chortomlyk flowed into the ditch they had dug, and the Sich itself found itself on an island.

On 14 May 1709 O.S. (25 May 1709 N.S.), three Tsarist regiments (полки, polky) laid siege to the Chortomlyk Sich. A detachment (загін, zahin) led by company colonel Hnat Galagan came to Yakovlev's aid, as he knew the Sich and its surroundings well, and falsely promised the Sich Cossacks immunity. However, they failed to capture and destroy the Sich on their first attempt. Moreover, Yakovlev's troops suffered considerable losses. Several hundred Zaporizhian Cossacks, who were at the Sich at the time, defended themselves using the Sich's artillery; around 350 of the attackers were killed and over 150 were wounded.

But the Zaporizhian Cossacks were unable to hold their defences and, boarding their boats, they set off down the Dnipro. The Muscovite troops stormed the Sich, seizing 36 cannons and other weapons, including Cossack boats. Carrying out his orders, Muscovite colonel Yakovlev took all remaining soldiers and civilians captive, then demolished the Sich fortress, and burnt down the huts and military buildings. Thereafter, the Tsarist troops marched down the Dnipro and began to round up and execute even those Cossacks who were out hunting and had not taken part in the military operations.

Following the battle, the Kish otaman, the military judge, 26 kurin otamans, 2 monks, 250 ordinary Cossacks, 160 women and children were taken as prisoners of war. Of these, 5 people died and 156 were executed. Several of the dead were hung from rafts and sent downstream to strike fear into the hearts of others.

Otaman Stepanenko wrote in a letter to Hetman Ivan Skoropadsky:

What happened here in the Sich was that, in accordance with the oaths of Galagan and Moscow, the leaders of our brotherhood were beaten, their necks were severed on the block, they were hanged, and other tyrannical forms of execution were meted out; and they did things that were unheard of even in pagan times, under the ancient tormentors: they dug up the dead from many coffins—not only lay people but also monks—cut off their heads, flayed them and hanged them.

On 26 June 1709 O.S. (7 July 1709 N.S., one day before the Battle of Poltava), tsar Peter issued a proclamation addressed to the Ukrainian people, which stated:

The constant lawlessness and insubordination of the fickle and rebellious Zaporizhian Cossacks have long been known. As rebels and insubordinates, they are to be exterminated and deserve to be put to death.

== Subsequent events ==
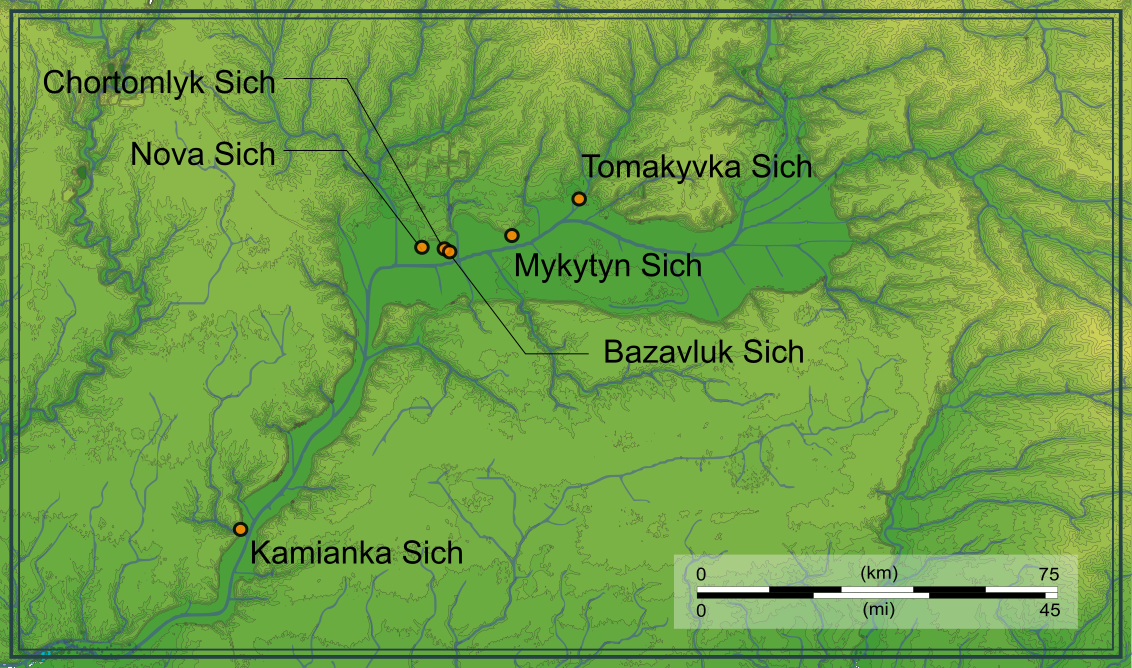
Siches of the Great Meadow.

Kost Hordiienko, along with a contingent of Zaporizhian Cossacks and Ivan Mazepa's Cossacks, fled to Bender, Moldova in the territories controlled by the Ottoman Empire. The rest of the Zaporizhian Cossacks, together with part of the Swedish army, were taken prisoner by the Muscovites at the surrender at Perevolochna (30 June 1709 O.S.; 11 July 1709 N.S.). These Cossacks were either executed, or exiled to Siberia.

Some of the Zaporizhian Cossacks, including Hordiienko, joined Mazepa in his exile in Bender, and following his death elected Pylyp Orlyk as the new Hetman-in-exile in April 1710. In early 1711, several thousand Zaporizhian Cossacks took part in Pylyp Orlyk's March on Right-bank Ukraine with the aim of restoring an independent Hetmanate, which ended in failure. Most other Zaporizhian Cossacks headed south, and in 1709 founded the new Kamianka Sich at the confluence of the river Kamianka and the Dnipro. Two years later in May 1711, on Peter's orders during the Prut Campaign, the Kamianka Sich was sacked by Muscovite troops led by General Buturlin and Left-Bank Hetman Skoropadsky as well. The majority of Cossacks then resettled to the Oleshky Sich, near the mouth of the river Dnipro in the Black Sea, putting themselves under the protection of the Crimean Khanate.

== Consequences ==
In accordance with the Treaty of the Pruth (1711) and the Treaty of Adrianople (1713), the Muscovite state renounced its claims to Right-bank Ukraine and Zaporizhia, and recognised the jurisdiction of the Ottoman Empire over the Zaporizhian Sich. The Zaporizhian Cossacks at the Oleshky Sich) remained under the authority of the Ottoman Empire until 1734.

Having begun preparations for war with the Crimean Khanate and the Ottoman Empire, the Russian authorities once again invited the Cossacks to return to upstream Zaporizhia. In March 1734, the Zapirozhian Cossacks founded the so-called Nova Sich on the Pidpilna River (a tributary of the Dnipro), near the former Chortomlyk (Old) Sich. In the summer of 1734, the Treaty of Lubny was signed, which consolidated the Russian Empire's authority over the territory of the Zaporizhian Host.

== See also ==
- Battle of the Sich (1674)
- Stand on the Sich (1679)
- The History of the Zaporizhian Cossacks (Myshetsky) (written in the 1740s)
- Liquidation of the autonomy of the Cossack Hetmanate (1764–1765)
- Liquidation of the Zaporizhian Sich (1775)

== Bibliography ==
- Shcherbak, Vitaliy Oleksiyovych (2013). "Чортомлицька Січ" [Chortomlytska Sich]. Encyclopedia of History of Ukraine (in Ukrainian). Vol. 10. Kyiv: Institute of History of Ukraine. p. 574. Archived from the original on 24 June 2026.
- Hurzhiy, Oleksandr Ivanovych (2010). "Олешківська Січ" [Oleshkivska Sich]. Encyclopedia of History of Ukraine (in Ukrainian). Vol. 7. Kyiv: Institute of History of Ukraine. p. 584. Archived from the original on 23 June 2026.
- Tairova-Yakovleva, Tatiana (2020). Ivan Mazepa and the Russian Empire (PDF). Montreal Kingston London Chicago: McGill-Queen's Press. p. 425. ISBN 978-0-2280-0309-0.
- Yavornytsky, Dmytro Ivanovych (1993) [1897]. Історія запорозьких козаків. Том 3 (1686–1734) [History of the Zaporizhian Cossacks. Volume 3 (1686–1734)] (PDF) (in Ukrainian). Kyiv: Naukova Dumka. p. 588. ISBN 5-12-002052-6. (history until 1734)
