= Battle of Opishnia =

Battle during the Swedish invasion of Russia

- Part of the Poltava campaign and the Northern War in Ukraine
Date	28 January 1709 (O.S.); 29 January 1709 (Swedish calendar); 8 February 1709 (N.S.)
Location	Opishnia, Ukraine
Result	Swedish victory

Belligerents
Swedish Empire	Tsardom of Russia

Commanders and leaders
Charles XII of Sweden	Otto Rudolf von der Schaumburg; Aleksandr Danilovich Menshikov; Karl Evald von Rönne

Strength
2,000–2,500 men	6,000 men

Casualties and losses
19	450

The Battle of Opishnia (or Oposhnia) took place on 8 February 1709 (New Style), during the Poltava campaign in the Northern War in Ukraine

== Prelude ==
After the costly siege of Veprik the Swedes under Charles XII of Sweden started an offensive against the Russian army in the area. The intention of this offensive was not clear to the Russians, so they subsequently had to spread their main forces out to cover possible attack directions. One of these forces was the troops under Otto Rudolf von der Schaumburg positioned at Opishnia on the river Vorskla to block any attempt by the Swedes to cross the river.

== Battle ==
Charles intended to surprise Schaumburg and his 6,000 cavalry and force them off the location. He led 2,000–2,500 cavalry for this task and managed to catch the Russians completely off guard while they were having dinner. Charles immediately charged with his men and swept the Russian forces out of the town followed by a hot pursuit on foot. During the battle, Russian generals Aleksandr Danilovich Menshikov and Karl Evald von Rönne also showed up.

== Aftermath ==
In this action the Russians lost more than 450 men, the Swedes only 19. Perhaps more importantly however, the Swedes could now cross the river Vorskla. The offensive continued for a while and Charles reached Krasnokutsk where he forced another Russian army on the run.
