= List of wars between Russia and Ukraine =

This article provides a list of armed conflicts in which Russian and Ukrainian national groups (under various historical statehoods) fought against each other.

== List ==
Russian victory

Ukrainian victory

Inconclusive

Date	Conflict	Belligerents	Belligerents	Result	Note
16th–17th centuries	Cossack raids into Russia	Zaporozhian Cossacks	Tsardom of Russia	Inconclusive	Cossack forces devastate Russian borderlands in sporadic incursions aimed at looting and sometimes settling territory, but no strategic campaign mounted against the Tsar.
1618	Prince Władysław's March on Moscow	Polish-Lithuanian Commonwealth; Zaporozhian Cossacks	Tsardom of Russia	Truce	Polish-cossacks forces reached Moscow; Truce of Deulino
1658	Romadanovsky invasion of Ukraine	Cossack Hetmanate	Tsardom of Russia	Russian victory	Armistice of Varva; Vyhovsky accepts Russian citizenship.
1659	Second Vyhovsky uprising	Cossack Hetmanate	Tsardom of Russia; Zaporozhian Sich	Russian victory	After a short-term success at Konotop, Russia again invades Ukrainian territories alongside loyalist Cossacks to overthrow Vyhovsky; Pereiaslav Articles enacted.
1673–1674	Sich-Tsardom crisis	Zaporozhian Sich	Tsardom of Russia Cossack Hetmanate	Zaporozhian Cossacks victory	As a result of complaints issued by Sirko and his Cossacks in respect to the lack of payments given to them,Tsar Alexey increased payments to the Zaporozhian Sich in order to resolve the crisis
1668-1669	Bryukhovetsky uprising	Cossack Hetmanate; Zaporozhian Sich	Tsardom of Russia; Polish–Lithuanian Commonwealth	Uprising suppressed	Moscow Articles of 1665 revised and Hlukhiv articles enacted, but Russia consolidates rule of left-bank Ukraine.
1708–1712	Northern War in Ukraine: Orlyk's March on Right-Bank Ukraine; Destruction of the Zaporozhian Sich; Battle of Poltava	Cossack Hetmanate; Swedish Empire; Ottoman Empire; Polish–Lithuanian Commonwealth (Leszczyński)	Tsardom of Russia	Russian victory	Cossack Hetmanate loses autonomy as well as all legal and international properties, therefore ceasing to exist as a state.
1734	Haydamak uprising of 1734	Haydamaks	Tsardom of Russia; Polish–Lithuanian Commonwealth	Uprising suppressed	
1750	Haydamak uprising of 1750	Haydamaks	Tsardom of Russia; Polish–Lithuanian Commonwealth	Uprising suppressed	
1768–1769	Koliivshchyna	Haydamak	Tsardom of Russia; Polish–Lithuanian Commonwealth	Uprising suppressed	
1855	Kyiv Cossack insurrection	Cossacks	Russian Empire	Uprising suppressed	
1917–1918	First Ukrainian–Soviet War	Russian SFSR	Ukrainian People's Republic (1917–1918); Ukrainian State (1918); German Empire; Austro-Hungarian Monarchy	Ukrainian victory	Establishment of the Ukrainian State under the Central Powers in the prosperous opening stage of the ultimately unsuccessful Ukrainian War of Independence.
1919–1921	Second Ukrainian–Soviet War	Russian SFSR	Ukrainian People's Republic	Bolshevik victory	Annexation of independent Ukraine into the newly created Ukrainian Socialist Soviet Republic.
1944–1960	UPA anti-Soviet campaign	Ukrainian Insurgent Army	Soviet Union	Soviet victory	Western Ukraine annexed into the Ukrainian SSR and 570,000+ Ukrainians killed or deported to other Soviet territories.
2014–present	Russo-Ukrainian War; 2014 pro-Russian unrest in Ukraine; 2014 Russian annexation of Crimea; War in Donbas (2014–2022); 2022 Russian invasion of Ukraine; Russo-Ukrainian War (2022–present)	Russian Federation; Republic of Belarus (Note: In 2022, Belarus allowed Russia to use its territory to launch the invasion and to launch missiles into Ukraine.); DPR Korea(since 2024)	Ukraine	Ongoing	Approximately 20% of Ukraine occupied by Russia as of 2024: 2022 Russian annexation of southern and eastern Ukraine, including Donetsk People's Republic and Luhansk People's Republic

== See also ==
- List of wars involving Russia
  - List of wars between Poland and Russia
  - List of wars between Russia and Sweden
  - Russo-Turkish wars
- List of wars involving Ukraine
  - List of wars between Poland and Ukraine
- List of invasions and occupations of Ukraine
