= Battle of Lysianka (1711) =

- Part of Pylyp Orlyk's March on Right-bank Ukraine and the Northern War in Ukraine
Date	February – March 1711 O.S.
Location	Lysianka, Cherkasy Regiment, Cossack Hetmanate
Result	Orlyk victory
Territorial changes	Bohuslav and Korsun Regiments surrendered without a battle

Belligerents
Supporters of Orlyk; Crimean Khanate	Supporters of Skoropadskyi; Tsardom of Muscovy

Commanders and leaders
Pylyp Orlyk; Samiylo Samus; Ivan Popovych; Andriy Kandyba; Danylo Sytynskyi	Ivan Skoropadskyi; Stepan Butovych (POW)

Strength
Unknown	Unknown

Casualties and losses
Unknown	Unknown

The Battle of Lysianka 1711 in February–March 1711 (O.S.) took place during the Pylyp Orlyk's March on Right-bank Ukraine of 1711 against the Russian Tsardom and against Pro-Russian Cossacks.

== Battle ==
In late February or early March (O.S.), the alliance army continued the move. It was headed to the only still respected Moscow outpost on the Right Bank of Ukraine — Bila Tserkva. The route ran first to the east, to Zvenyhorodka, and from there — to the northwest, to the river Ros. The goal was, obviously, to seize the whole Right-bank Ukraine all the way to the Dnieper river: for that the capture of the Bila Tserkva was essential.

An army under the command of general osavul Stepan Butovych opposed Pylyp Orlyk's troops and was defeated in the battle near Lysianka, the osavul himself was taken prisoner. The hetman was supported by the revolted Ukrainian people.

The victory near Lysyanka had a significant resonance. Ukrainian cities, including the regimental Bohuslav and Korsun, surrendered without a fight. Mazepa's successor was supported in his quest to extend his power to the Right Bank by colonel Samiilo Ivanovych (Samus) of the Bohuslav Regiment, colonel Andrii Kandyba of the Korsun Regiment, colonel Ivan Popovych of the Uman Regiment, and colonel Danylo Sytynskyi of the Kaniv Regiment. This was facilitated by Pylyp Orlyk's letters-universals "to the militant maloros people" with a call to oppose the Moscow tsar. One of them was issued by the hetman on 9 March 1711 (O.S.) in Lysianka.

Pylyp Orlyk's universals were known throughout the Right-Bank Ukraine and were distributed up to and including the Pereiaslav Regiment lands. Impressed by the successful combat maneuvers and the transition of the Cossack rulers to his side, the hetman informed King Charles XII of Sweden that his army had grown more than fivefold.
