= Battle of Krasnokutsk–Gorodnoye =

1709 battle of the Great Northern War

- Part of the Poltava campaign and the Northern War in Ukraine
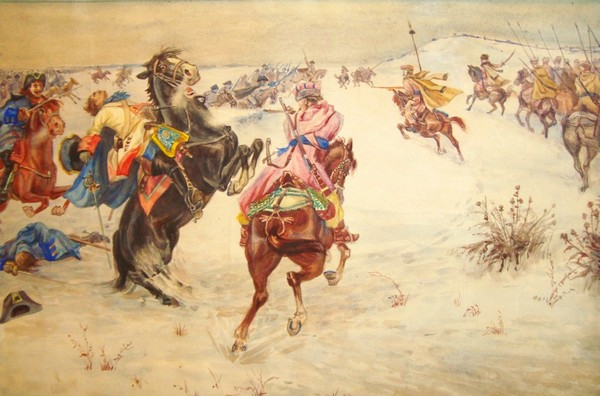
- Fighting between Cossacks and Drabants
Date	10 February 1709 (O.S.); 11 February 1709 (Swedish calendar); 21 February 1709 (N.S.)
Location	Krasnokutsk and Horodnje (present-day Ukraine) 50°04′N 35°10′E
Result	Swedish victory

Belligerents
Swedish Empire	Tsardom of Russia

Commanders and leaders
Charles XII; Carl Kruse	Karl Evald von Rönne; Otto Schaumburg

Strength
2,500	12,000

Casualties and losses
132	1,000–1,200

The Battle of Krasnokutsk–Gorodnoye took place on 20–22 February 1709 (N.S.), in the Poltava campaign of the Northern War in Ukraine. The Swedish troops were directly led by Charles XII of Sweden who pursued a force of Russians commanded by Otto Rudolf von der Schaumburg from the minor battle of Krasnokutsk to the town of Horodnie (Gorodnoye) (both in Sloboda Ukraine) where a new battle took place, with the Russians now commanded by Karl Evald von Rönne. The Swedes were victorious, but halted their offensive as night fell.

== Prelude ==
In 1708, Charles XII launched a campaign through Belarus, changing direction before Smolensk due to inadequate provisions, now heading for the Cossack Hetmanate in fertile Left-bank Ukraine. In early 1709, Charles XII seized Vepryk after having launched a costly assault. Soon thereafter, he went on a winter offensive to dislodge the Russian forces ahead of him while scorching the land between the two armies to protect his own from Russian harassment. He defeated an army under Otto Rudolf von der Schaumburg at the Battle of Opishnia on 8 February and another one at Khukhra on 19 February, which cleared the way for a march on the Russian main army at Okhtyrka.

In response to this, Peter I ordered the bulk of his infantry to evacuate Okhtyrka to avoid a decisive engagement, before leaving his army for Voronezh. Carl Ewald von Rönne was sent to Krasnokutsk and Gorodnoye with an army consisting of mostly dragoons, but also some infantry, Cossacks and Kalmuks, to cover the retreat. According to Russian estimates, Rönne's army consisted of 12,000 men, while Swedish estimates puts it at 18,000 or even 24,000 men.

== Engagement ==
On 21 February, Charles XII captured a Russian outpost 10 km northwest of Krasnokutsk, revealing to him the Russian dispositions therein. Reportedly, their force consisted of seven regiments (or 5,000 men) under von Schaumburg. Charles XII galloped to Krasnokutsk with a vanguard of 2,500 cavalry, including the Drabant Corps, to attack the Russians the same day. Some 3,500 additional Swedes, marching far behind the vanguard, would not make it in time to participate in the fighting. Swedish historians Frey Rydeberg and Carl Bennedich would later characterize the forthcoming battle as the "proudest day of the Swedish cavalry."

The Swedes, with Charles XII and the Drabants upfront, achieved total surprise, killing hundreds of Russians in the streets, gardens and farms, while the houses were cleared by the use of grenades. The Russian horses were much inferior to their own, letting the Swedes wreak havoc in their lines. The Russians, who fled towards Gorodnoye half a mile to the north-east, formed up in order de bataille halfway there, at a very advantageous position with protected flanks. The Swedes broke through the Cossacks and Kalmucks who screened their front and continued towards the dragoons. Seeing this, the Russians again retreated; one part past Gorodnoye to the right, pursued by a force under Carl Gustaf Kruse, and the other to the left of Gorodnoye through its suburbs, with the Swedish king, his Drabants and some dragoons hot on their heels. Here, the enemies were relentlessly massacred as they were chased through the narrow streets.

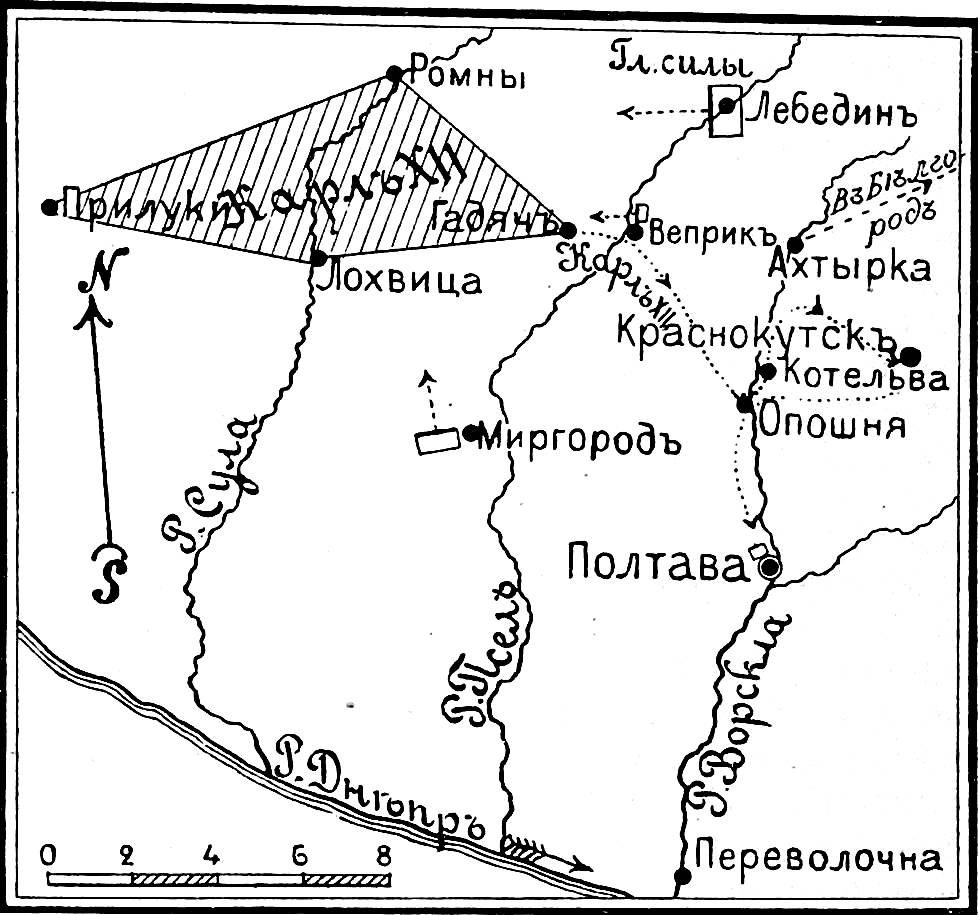
Map showing the engagements at Krasnokutsk–Gorodnoye

The Swedish force under Kruse, passing Gorodnoye to the right, got dispersed and subsequently routed when overwhelming Russian reinforcements arrived under Rönne. As they withdrew towards Krasnokutsk, (Note: According to Nordberg, the manner in which the Swedes, pursuing the Russians to the right of Gorodnoye, were repulsed was both "shameful and displeasing to see".) Rönne turned his attention towards Charles XII's force; his pursuit continued through the suburbs, over a height and past a millpond, when Rönne's large army suddenly appeared on his right side, from Gorodnoye. It consisted of six dragoon regiments and two battalions, or up to 10,000 men. At this time, the Swedish king had but 600 exhausted men by his side.

The Russians quickly seized the opportunity and attacked, and the Swedes marched to receive them. The Swedish dragoons were quickly repulsed after receiving several volleys from the Russian infantry; fruitless attempts were made by Charles XII to rally them, but their depleted banners fell back towards the height and the millpond, dragging the king and the Drabants with them. Here, Charles XII rallied his troops in defense. After a while of fighting, Kruse, who had by this time rallied his dispersed troops, arrived and forced the enemies to retreat from the battlefield.

== Aftermath ==
After the battle, the Swedes scorched the two small towns. Allegedly, the Drabants had killed 115 Russians at Gorodnoye, (Note: Robert Petre writes: "I counted from the town of Gorodnoye, where the massacre began [sic], to Krasnokutsk, 639 killed (...) in the town of Krasnokutsk, where we arrived at 10 o'clock in the morning (...) I counted 115 killed, all of which had been pierced by Drabant-swords"; since he counted these bodies at the last place [Gorodnoye], Petre must have mixed up the names. Norsbergh writes: "the king rode into the town of Krasnokutsk with the cavalry and immediately started cutting down the enemies (...) they retreated, one part past Gorodnoye to the right, and the other to the left through its suburb with Charles XII, the Drabants, and a regiment of dragoons hot on their heels. With drawn swords, the enemies were chased through the narrow streets and relentlessly massacred." According to Nordberg, an additional 400 Russians also died when they fell through the ice on the Merla River.) and many more during the pursuit between the small towns, where 639 bodies were subsequently counted. The Drabants had up to 10 men killed and one captured, with an unknown amount of wounded. In total, the Russians had lost 1,000–1,200 in killed, to only 130 Swedes. Bad weather, however, prevented Charles XII from pushing any further.

== Notes, citations and sources ==
=== Sources ===
- From, Peter: Katastrofen vid Poltava, Historiska media, Lund 2007 (Swedish)
- Lanciai, Christian: Segern och nederlaget, 1974 (Swedish)
- Nordisk Familjebok (Swedish)
- opoccuu (Russian)
- Quennerstedt, August (1901). Karolinska krigares dagböcker jämte andra samtida skrifter, volume 1 (in Swedish). Lund: Gleerupska univ. bokhandeln. OCLC 186563462.
- Carlsson, Einar (1947). Karolinska förbundets årsbok 1947: Krasnokutsk—Gorodnoe—Kolomak (in Swedish). Stockholm: Karolinska förbundet. OCLC 470214638.
- Dorrell, Nicholas (2009). The Dawn of the Tsarist Empire: Poltava & the Russian Campaigns of 1708–1709. Nottingham: Partizan Press. ISBN 978-1-85818-594-1.
- Grimberg, Carl; Uddgren, Hugo (1914). Svenska krigarbragder: Drabanterna vid Gorodnoje (in Swedish). Stockholm: P.A. Norstedt & Söner. OCLC 472743171.
- Nordberg, Jöran (1740a). Konung Carl den XII:tes Historia, volume 1 (in Swedish). Stockholm: Pet. Momma. OCLC 256604521.
- Schreber von Schreeb, Tor (1942). Carl XII:s drabantkår: historik jämte personförteckning 1700–1721 (in Swedish). Stockholm: Linkoln Bloms Boktryckeri. OCLC 186010251.
- Quennerstedt, August (1907). Karolinska krigares dagböcker jämte andra samtida skrifter, volume 3 (in Swedish). Lund: Gleerupska univ. bokhandeln. OCLC 186563487.
