= Siege of Bila Tserkva (1711) =

- Part of Pylyp Orlyk's March on Right-bank Ukraine and the Northern War in Ukraine
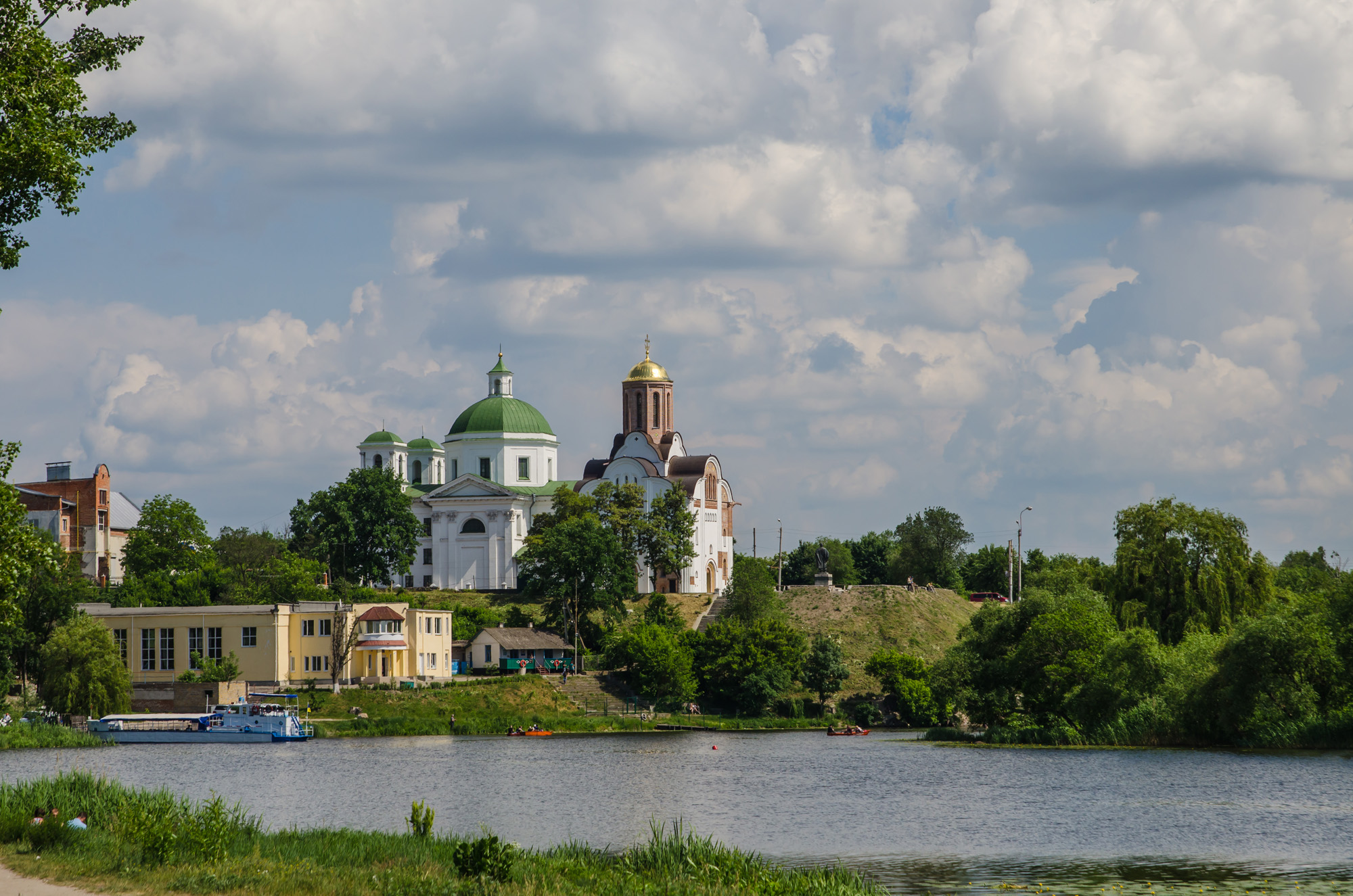
- Zamkova Hill (Bila Tserkva)
Date	25–27 March 1711 (O.S.); 5–7 April 1711 (N.S.)
Location	Bila Tserkva, Polish–Lithuanian Commonwealth
Result	Russian victory

Belligerents
Crimean Khanate in raid Supported by: Ottoman Empire	Pylyp Orlyk's Cossacks; Crimean Khanate before the raid Polish–Lithuanian Commonwealth	Tsardom of Russia: Bila Tserkva Regiment loyal to the Moscow tsar

Commanders and leaders
Devlet II Giray; Ahmed III	Pylyp Orlyk; Devlet II Giray Augustus II	Colonel Annenkov; Colonel Tansky

Strength
10,000 Tatars	10,000 Zaporozhian Cossacks	500 Russians

The Siege of Bila Tserkva of 25–27 March 1711 (O.S.) or 5–7 April 1711 (N.S.) took place during the Pylyp Orlyk's campaign of against the Russian Tsardom and the Crimean Khanate in Right-bank Ukraine.

== The siege of city ==
After the victory near Lysianka, the road to Bila Tserkva was cleared. This time the army moved slowly so that it reached the Bila Tserkva region around 18 March O.S.

While advancing in the Syniava — Rokytne area, the army started to experience problems with provisions – hence the requisitions of the population intensified. As a result, the discipline was shaken – not only Tatars but also Poles allowed themselves violence against the civilian population.

In such difficult conditions, the army spent another week crossing the Ros – the dam and the bridge near Syniava were destroyed, and the help of the locals was needed.

The siege of Bila Tserkva started on 25 March O.S.. The city was well fortified, it housed the Moscow garrison. The fortress was well supplied with everything necessary to keep the siege; shortly before the arrival of the Orlyk's army, ammunition and provisions were delivered. The garrison of Bila Tserkva was quite small: it consisted of 500 Russians under the command of Colonel Annenkov, and parts of the Bila Tserkva Cossacks of Colonel Tansky, loyal to the Moscow tsar. Orlyk's forces at that time numbered about 10,000 Zaporozhian Cossacks and the Right-bank Cossacks who joined him, as well as Tatars and Poles.

The siege of the city began, but the number of attackers did not play a significant role in this process: the Tatar-Polish cavalry could not help in the siege, and it all depended on whether Orlyk managed to seize the fortress with the technical means he had at his disposal. There was almost no artillery in Orlyk's army; there were only 4 or 5 canons. It was not possible to achieve the desired effect with the existing resources.

Despite the besieging of the town, the garrison of the fortress successfully repulsed all the attacks by Orlyk's army. Twice during the second and third days of the siege the Cossacks tried to attack the castle after gaining a foothold in the lower part of the town and making sconces, but were unsuccessful both times. None of the assaults were effective, as the garrison had sufficient ammunition and strong artillery.

== Betrayal by the Tatars ==
Three days of besieging the city (25–27 March O.S.) yielded no success. The discontent of the Tatars was growing — the young and inexperienced sultan could not restrain the horde, who was demanding permission to take yasir. The dissatisfaction of the Tatars on one hand was amplified by the lack of provisions for people and horses, and on the other — by the approach of spring, melting snow and flooding of rivers, which nullified the mobility of Tatar troops in the event of Moscow army's attack.

Seeing no progress in storming the fortress, the Tatar army withdrew, spreading its troops almost to the Dnieper river, and moved south to the Bug river, taking yasir and destroying settlements. Orlyk rushed after them, begging the sultan to return or give him at least 10,000 Tatars to continue the war, but received a refusal.

The Tatars' betrayal had catastrophic consequences for the whole campaign: the Right-bank Cossacks, who joined Orlyk, learned that Tatars were plundering villages and towns and taking people as prisoners so they rushed to save their loved ones. The army was getting smaller by the hour.
