= Ukrainian Civil War =

Ukrainian Civil War may refer to:

- 2014 Ukrainian Civil War
- Ukrainian War of Independence (1917–21)
  - Ukrainian–Soviet War (1917–21)
    - Anti-Hetman Uprising (1918)

== See also ==
- List of wars involving Ukraine
- List of invasions and occupations of Ukraine
