= Battle of Sokilka =

Engagement during the Great Northern War

- Part of the Swedish invasion of Russia
| Date | 12 April 1709 (O.S.); 13 April 1709 (Swedish calendar); 23 April 1709 (N.S.) |
| Location | Sokilka at the Vorskla River, Ukraine |
| Result | Inconclusive |

Belligerents
| Swedish Empire; Cossack Hetmanate | Tsardom of Russia; Cossack Hetmanate |

Commanders and leaders
| Carl Gustaf Kruse | Karl Evald von Rönne |

Strength
| 2,730 Swedish regulars 3,500 Cossacks | 3,000 dragoons 2,000 Cossacks |

Casualties and losses
| Swedish claim: 290 Swedes; Russian claim: 800 Swedes and Cossacks; 4 artillery pieces | Per von Rönne: ~50; Per Menshikov: Up to 60; Swedish claim: 400 killed 1,000 wounded |

The Battle of Sokilka took place on 23 April 1709 (N.S.), near the town of Poltava, Ukraine, during the ninth year of the Great Northern War. The Swedish army of close to 3,000 cavalry under the command of Carl Gustaf Kruse and 3,500 Cossacks of Kost Hordiienko and Ivan Mazepa launched a surprise attack on a Russian camp of about 3,000 cavalrymen and 2,000 Cossacks under Karl Evald von Rönne. Although encamped and taken by surprise, the Russians were immediately alerted and successfully counterattacked, cutting their way through the enemy forces, and eventually escaped, having captured 4 guns left behind by the fleeing Zaporozhian Cossacks and a number of prisoners. The battle was fought in fog, both sides claimed victory. It was one of the encounters shortly before the decisive battle of Poltava which would seriously cripple the Swedish chances of victory in the war.

== Literature ==
- Peter From, Katastrofen vid Poltava (2007), Lund, Historiska media.
