= Battle of Tsarychanka (1709) =

Battle between the Zaporozhian Cossacks led by Kost Hordiienko

- Part of the Northern War in Ukraine
Date	6 April 1709
Location	near Tsarychanka, Cossack Hetmanate (now Dnipropetrovsk Oblast, Ukraine
Result	Cossack victory

Belligerents
Zaporozhian Sich	Tsardom of Russia

Commanders and leaders
Kost Hordiyenko	Brigadier Kampell

Units involved
Unknown	3 dragoon regiments

Strength
800 men	3,000 men

Casualties and losses
30 killed	100 killed 90–100 captured

The Battle of Tsarychanka (or Tsarichanka) was a battle that took place in March 1709 between the Zaporozhian Cossacks led by Kost Hordiienko and the 3,000-strong Russian unit of brigadier Kampell, during the Northern War in Ukraine as a part of Great Northern War. The Cossacks of Hordiienko inflicted a defeat on Kampell's unit and forced it to withdraw.

== Battle ==
Knowing about Hordiienko defecting to the Swedish side, the Russian commandership sent three units with goal of stopping him from joining the Swedish army. This forced Hordiyenko to start military actions - as soon as his Cossacks crossed the borders of Zaporozhian Sich, they started attacking the Russian units and outposts. On 6 April, a unit of 800 Cossacks led by Kost Hordiyenko approached Tsarychanka, where a Russian unit of brigadier Kampell, with 3,000 men, was stationed. The Cossacks attacked it and a battle took place, as a result of which, the Russians had lost 100 men killed and 90 or 100 men captured, and retreated from Tsarychanka, allowing Cossacks to capture the settlement. The Cossack forces lost 30 people.

== Aftermath ==
Following the battle, Hordiienko captured several cities on the Vorskla, Oril and Dnieper and placed the Zaporozhian garrisons there, while himself approaching Dykanka, in order to meet up with Mazepa and, from there, to depart to Velyki Budyshcha, where Charles XII had stationed himself. This battle, although had tactical importance, did not affect the course of Charles XII's campaign in Russia, which had eventually ended with a Swedish defeat at Poltava, while the Chortomlyk Sich was sacked on 25 May 1709 for defecting to the Swedes.

== Legacy ==
The battle is most famously known for being depicted on Nikolay Samokish's painting "Battle of Tsarychanka in 1709".
