= Executions of Cossacks in Lebedyn =

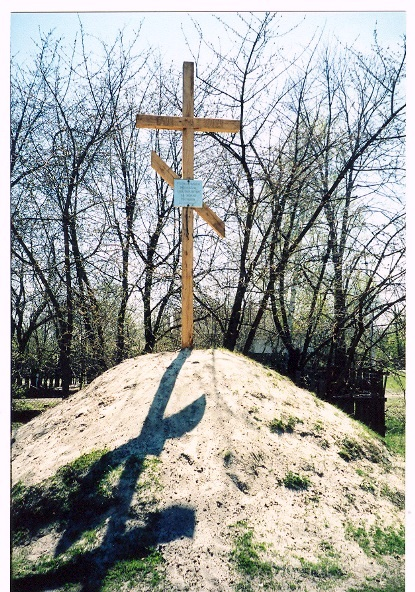
A Memorial Cross to the tortured and executed Cossacks of Lebedyn

From 1708 to 1709, executions of Cossacks in Lebedyn (Ukrainian: Катівня в Лебедині; Russian: Казни казаков в Лебедине) were carried out against Ukrainian Cossacks that were suspected of siding with Hetman Ivan Mazepa after his break with Tsar Peter I during the Great Northern War. Cossack officials summoned to the Council of Hlukhiv who did not report to it were arrested, tortured and executed for treason. The exact number of victims is not known, but the minutes of the historical accounts indicate at least 900.

== Background ==
The persecutions started with a decree by Tsar Peter issued on 1 November 1708 which read "And those who by this Decree, having forgotten the fear of God and the Oath to Us, the Great Tsar, and the wholeness and indivisibility of the Motherland from him, the thief and traitor Mazepa, and from this enemy shall not depart, and to Us, the Great Tsar, would not return in the course of this month, i.e. by the 1st of December 1708, shall be declared our and our Motherland's traitors. And their titles and estates and all belongings shall be confiscated and given to the faithful ones for their service. And the wives and children [of the traitors] shall be sent into internal exile. And those caught shall be executed without mercy." Consequently, an investigative commission was set up by Peter I in Lebedyn. The commission was presided by Alexander Menshikov All those suspected of loyalty to Mazepa, including those who did not report to the Hlukhiv Rada council, were taken to Lebedin for torture and execution. Archbishop Konissky wrote:

"The execution was a usual Menshikov's craft: wheeling and putting on a stake, but the easiest one, considered a child's play, was hanging and beheading. Their guilt was determined through their own confession, and the reliable means for that was the most glorious "sacrament" of the time - torture, of which postulates are still known to these days by this Russian proverb: "The whip is not an Angel: it won't remove the soul from the body, but shall compel the truth", and which tortures were carried out with the utmost accuracy and according to the instructions of the Assembly Code (Sobornoe Ulozhenie) in other words: step-by-step and in this order - first whip, then whip and splint i.e., hot iron, that was drawn gently and slowly over the flesh of a living man from which act he would seeth, and boil, and rise in agony. Whoever passed one test was next tried with another one, and all of them who could not stand it were declared guilty and led away to execution. In such a way, not overcoming the torture, suffered nine hundred people; this number is perhaps overstated, but, judging by the cemetery, segregated from the Christian one and known as Hetman Men's Cemetery], it may be concluded that not a small number of them were buried there".

Reliability of events (in particular, the number of executions) is the subject of debate.

== Description ==
After Mazepa sided with the Swedes, Peter I issued a decree, which supposedly led to the torture and executions in Lebedyn. "The decree for army sergeants who had left with the Swedes to Mazepa" from 1 November 1708 as:

"And those who by this Decree, having forgotten the fear of God and the Oath to Us, the Great Tsar, and the wholeness and indivisibility of the Motherland from him, the thief and traitor Mazepa, and from this enemy shall not depart, and to Us, the Great Tsar, would not return in the course of this month, i.e. by the 1st of December 1708, shall be declared our and our Motherland's traitors. And their titles and estates and all belongings shall be confiscated and given to the faithful ones for their service. And the wives and children [of the traitors] shall be sent into internal exile. And those caught shall be executed without mercy".

Description of the events in Lebedyn are known from the anonymous "History of Ruthenians" and compiled on the basis of its "History of Little Russia" NA Markevich. At the same time in the "History of Ruthenians" there is no description of the location of the "grave of Hetman's people" and its size.

About the torture and execution of the Cossacks in Lebedin, referring to the alleged author of "History of Ruthenians" Archbishop George Konissky of Belarus and legends preserved among the locals, writes Archbishop Filaret (Gumilevsky) in his book "Historical and statistical description of Kharkov diocese, "written in 1852-59:

"The most wonderful time for Lebedyn was the end of 1708 and beginning of 1709. Around November 20, Peter the Great arrived in Lebedyn to the army. In Lebedyn, along with Peter were his generals - Menshikov and others. Konissky points the extensive Getmantsy grave in Lebedin as a monument to the inhumane cruelty of Prince Menshikov. He said that Menshikov used different torture - whip, hot iron were used against the unfortunate victims of Mazepa's fraud, conscious about their collaboration Mazeppa. According to local reports, the tomb of Getmantsy is now located in the garden of one of the parishioners of the Church of the Ascension, 300 yards from the former city wall, a lofty mound extends more than 10 yards in length and width; places of the embankment are collapsed and at times during construction human bones are dug out".

He gives a description of the alleged location of the "grave Getmantsev" and its size.

Various research studies and literature by Ukrainian and foreign authors on hetman Mazepa provide information about these events. Lebedyn penalty is described in the literary - artistic work "Ivan Mazepa" by Ukrainian historian I. Borschaka and French historian Rene Martel, published in Paris in 1931, in T. Matskiv's work "Ivan Mazepa in western sources 1687-1709" (referring to Professor Ogloblin), published in Munich in 1988. The same information is resulted in Encyclopaedia of knowledges about Ukraine. But all of this information is reduced to a repetition of information from the "History of Ruthenians".

== Memory ==
Sumy Regional State Administration and local authorities implemented several measures to perpetuate the memory of the victims of executions. Information about is them posted on the official websites of Sumy Regional Council, Lebedyn City Council and Lebedyn Regional State Administration, on which the decision to establish a memorial cross and to install a monument of Cossack glory. Board of Lebedin city announced a competition to design the monument. According to the deputy chairman of the Sumy Regional State Administration, in April 2009 it was scheduled to replace a wooden cross on the grave of "Getmantsy" for the monument.

== Bibliography ==
- Nikolai Markevich. "History of Little Russia" in 5 volumes.
- Sergei Pavlenko. Ivan Mazepa. - Kiev: Alternatives, 2003.
- Filaret. Historical and statistical description of Kharkiv tion diocese. - Kharkov: Publishing House "Rider" / - 2004. - Pp. 114.
- Elie Borschak, Rene Martel. Vie de Mazeppa. Paris, 1931. (Борщак.І., Martel R. Ivan Mazepa. Lviv: Chervona viburnum, 1933. Authorized translation from French by Michael Rudnitskogo)
- Микола Мазепа. Катівня в Лебедині
