= Perevolochna =

Perevolochna Переволочна Przewłoczna
- submerged settlement (fortress)
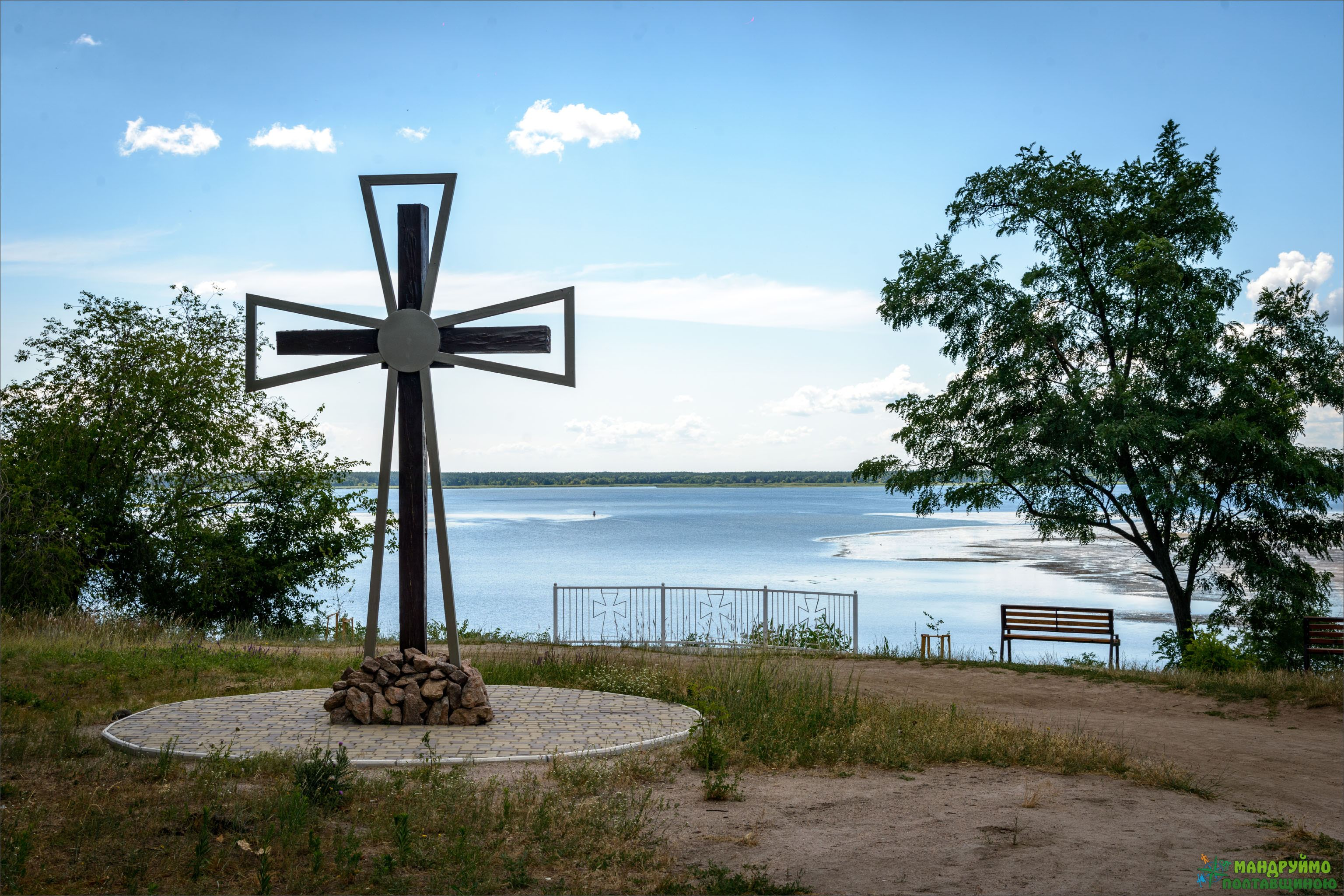
- Dnieper at the site of Perevolochna

- Location within Ukraine Location within Poltava Oblast
- Coordinates: 48.863603°N 34.060570°E
- Country: Ukraine
- Oblast: Poltava

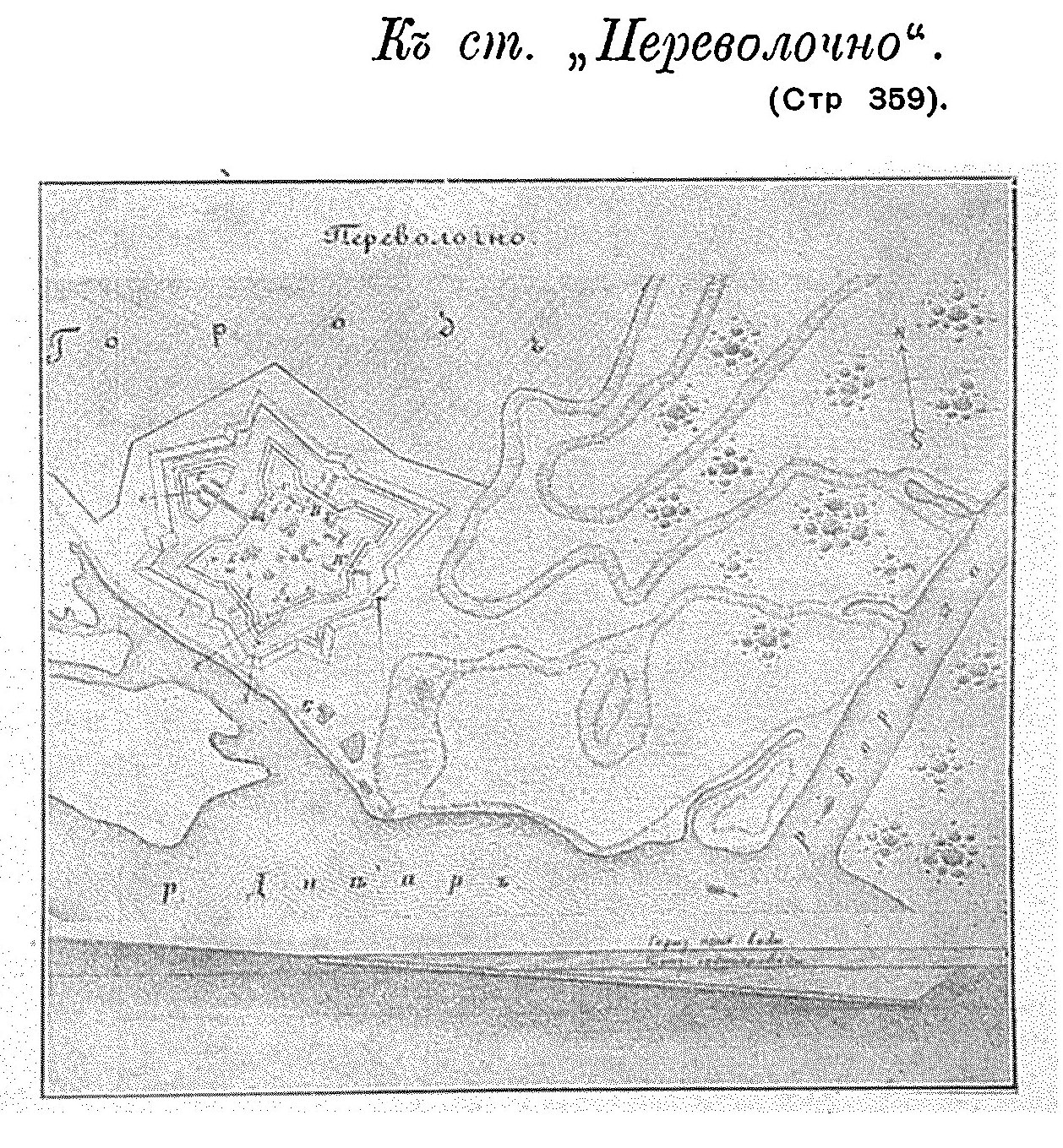
Perevolochna

Perevolochna (Ukrainian: Переволочна) is a former fortress and town in the Polish–Lithuanian Commonwealth and Cossack Hetmanate, and later a village in Poltava Oblast. Before the establishment of Kamianske Water Reservoir in the 1960s, here also existed a river crossing. The settlement was situated at the bank of the Dnieper near the mouth of Vorskla River, where a ford across Dnieper enabled people to cross the river, hence its name. The crossing Perevolochna – Mishuryn Rih was also a key crossing during the Battle of the Dnieper in October 1943.

== History ==
Perevolochna was founded at the turn of the 13th to 14th century by the Lithuanian Grand Duke Vytautas the Great as a fortified settlement in order to protect his empire against enemies from the East.

Again Perevolochna is mentioned in 1640s belonging to Yuri Nemyrych (Jerzy Niemirycz), but it was also claimed by Potocki family. After the start of Khmelnytsky Uprising the town belonged to Chyhyryn Regiment, since 1661 it was part of Kremenchuk Regiment. Since mid 1660s it belonged to Poltava Regiment. Claims to Perevolochna were laid by the Zaporizhian Sich. Role of the town increased from mid 1680s, as it was the main fort on the Crimean direction.

In April 1709 Russian forces burned down Perevolochna. On July 11, 1709, three days after the Swedish army had been defeated at the Battle of Poltava, the remainder of the Swedish army under General Adam Ludwig Lewenhaupt surrendered at Perevolochna to Russian General Aleksandr Menshikov. King Charles XII of Sweden, hetman Ivan Mazepa and Kost Hordiienko with 3,000 Swedes and Cossacks managed to cross the Dnieper river and take refuge in Turkish-held Moldavia.

On maps from 1730s Perevolochna fortress is shown on the Dnieper river just north of the Ukrainian fortification line.

After the loss of Russia in the Pruth River Campaign, the fortress again became a key place of the Southern frontier. It also played a great role during the Russo-Turkish War of 1735–1739. During the 1760s Perevolochna lost its city status, and in 1785 Perevolochna fortress was liquidated.

Since 1802 it was a town within Kobeliaky county, Poltava Governorate. Since 1919 Perevolochna was a village.

During the World War II at the end of September 1943 the Soviet army stormed Dnieper near Perevolochna establishing the bridgehead ("foothold") of Auly.

Until being flooded by the Soviet government with creation of the Dniprodzerzhynsk reservoir (today Kamianske Reservoir) in the middle of the 1960s, it belonged to Kobeliaky Raion (district) of Poltava Oblast (province) of Ukraine. On 6 December 1963 population of Perevolochna and Kyshenky was moved to the newly established village of Svitlohirske, while the submerged settlements were excluded from record.

== Natives ==
- Birthplace of Yppolit Fedorovych Bohdanovich (1743–1803)
- Birthplace of Ivan Ivanovich Martinov (1771–1833)
