= List of invasions and occupations of Ukraine =

The territory of present-day Ukraine, a large country in eastern Europe north of the Black Sea, has been either invaded or occupied a number of times throughout its history.

== List ==
Conflict	Invasion	Attacking force(s)	Year	Details
Crimean–Nogai slave raids in Eastern Europe		Crimean Khanate	1450–1769	According to Ukrainian-Canadian historian Orest Subtelny, "from 1450 to 1586, eighty-six raids were recorded, and from 1600 to 1647, seventy. Although estimates of the number of captives taken in a single raid reached as high as 30,000, the average figure was closer to 3000...In Podillia alone, about one-third of all the villages were devastated or abandoned between 1578 and 1583." In 1769, the last major Tatar raid, which took place during the Russo-Turkish War, saw the capture of 20,000 slaves.
Russo-Polish War (1654–1667)	Battle of Konotop (1659)	Tsardom of Russia	1659	Ukrainian Cossacks led by Ivan Vyhovsky repelled an invasion by the Russian Tsardom at Konotop.
Ukrainian War of Independence (1917–1921)	First Soviet invasion of Ukraine; Battle of Kruty; Battle of Kiev (1918)	Russian SFSR	1918	Initial fighting in the war (Ukrainian–Soviet War) lasted from January to June 1918, ending with the Central Powers' intervention.
Ukrainian War of Independence (1917–1921)	Central Powers intervention in Ukraine	Germany; Austria-Hungary	1918	Imperial German and Austro-Hungarian forces entered Ukraine to push out Bolshevik forces, as part of an agreement with the Ukrainian People's Republic. Occupation: Ukrainian State (1918), a German-installed government of much of Ukraine.
Ukrainian War of Independence (1917–1921)	Allied intervention in Ukraine	France; Greece; Romania	1918–1919	Failure: Allies evacuate
Ukrainian War of Independence (1917–1921)	Intervention in Ukraine	Poland	1918–1919	Polish victory: Galicia Became Polish Ukraine defeat
Ukrainian War of Independence (1917–1921)	Second Soviet invasion of Ukraine	Russian SFSR	1919	A full-scale invasion began in January 1919. Ended with the invasion by the White Army.
Ukrainian War of Independence (1917–1921)	White invasion of Ukraine	South Russia	1919	White Army captures Donbas, Kharkiv, Odesa, Kyiv. Ended with the invasion by the Red Army.
Ukrainian War of Independence (1917–1921)	Third Soviet invasion of Ukraine	Russian SFSR	1919–1920	Red Army captures Kharkiv, Kyiv, Donbas and Odesa.
World War II (1939–1945)	Hungarian invasion of Carpatho-Ukraine	Hungary	1939	The Kingdom of Hungary occupied and annexed the just-proclaimed Carpatho-Ukraine. The Governorate of Subcarpathia (1939–1945) region included her former territory.
World War II (1939–1945)	Soviet invasion of Poland (Ukrainian Front)	Soviet Union	1939	The Soviet Union invaded Poland in September 1939, extending into Western Ukraine. Occupation: After the Soviet annexation of Eastern Galicia and Volhynia, the Soviet Union occupied Western Ukraine until it fell to Nazi Germany in November 1941. They retook the land in 1944.
World War II (1939–1945)	Operation Barbarossa	Germany Romania	1941	Nazi Germany invaded the Soviet Union, including Ukraine, in June 1941 with assistance from allied Romania. By November they controlled almost all of what had been Soviet Ukraine, including the portion annexed in 1939. Occupations: Reichskommissariat Ukraine (1941–1944), the German occupation of most of the country.; Transnistria Governorate (1941–1944), the Romanian occupation of Transnistria.
Russo-Ukrainian war (2014–present)	Russian annexation of Crimea	Russia	2014	Russia invaded and subsequently annexed Crimea, then administered by Ukraine as the Autonomous Republic of Crimea, during February–March 2014, and also took control of part of the village of Strilkove in neighboring Kherson Oblast. Occupation: The Republic of Crimea and federal city of Sevastopol (2014–present), claimed by Russia as federal subjects and considered an occupation by the government of Ukraine (as part of the temporarily occupied territories of Ukraine) and by the United Nations.
Russo-Ukrainian war (2014–present)	War in Donbas	Russia	2014–2022	After a commencement of hostilities in April 2014, Russian forces invaded the Donbas region of Ukraine in August of that year. A report released by the Royal United Services Institute in March 2015 said that "the presence of large numbers of Russian troops on Ukrainian sovereign territory" became a "permanent feature" of the war following the invasion, with regular Russian and Ukrainian forces coming into direct conflict at the Battle of Ilovaisk and likely the Battle of Debaltseve. Low-intensity fighting continued through 2022, despite the declaration of numerous ceasefires. Occupation: The Donetsk People's Republic and Luhansk People's Republic (2014–2022) were breakaway states in eastern Ukraine that were supported by Russia.
Russo-Ukrainian war (2014–present)	Russo-Ukrainian war (2022–present)	Russia	2022–present	Russia began a full-scale invasion of Ukraine on 24 February 2022. Occupation: Russia occupied over 25% of Ukrainian territory before being pushed back in counteroffensives. Russia unilaterally declared that the Donetsk, Kherson, Luhansk and Zaporizhzhia oblasts were annexed into the Russian Federation (2022–present).

== See also ==
- List of invasions
- List of wars involving Ukraine
- List of wars between Russia and Ukraine
