= Surrender at Perevolochna =

Capitulation of Swedish forces in 1709

Perevolochna
- Part of the Swedish invasion of Russia
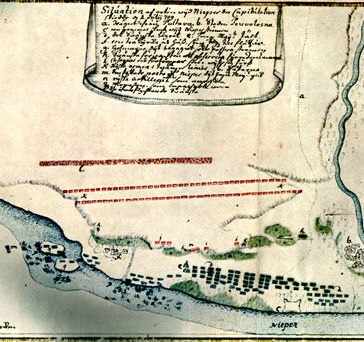
- Map depicting the surrender. Red=Russians and blue=Swedes. In the bottom left, Charles XII crosses the Dnieper along the two islands. Perovolocna is to the right, next to the Vorskla River.
| Date | 30 June 1709 (O.S.); 1 July 1709 (Swedish calendar); 11 July 1709 (N.S.) |
| Location | Perevolochna, present-day Ukraine 48.8167°N 34.1167°E |
| Result | Russian victory |

Belligerents
| Swedish Empire | Tsardom of Russia |

Commanders and leaders
| Adam Ludwig Lewenhaupt (surrendered) | Alexander Menshikov |

Strength
| 12,000–20,000 (Note: or 14,000) | 9,000 (Note: All of Menshikov's forces numbered 20,000.) |

Casualties and losses
| Entire army captured | |

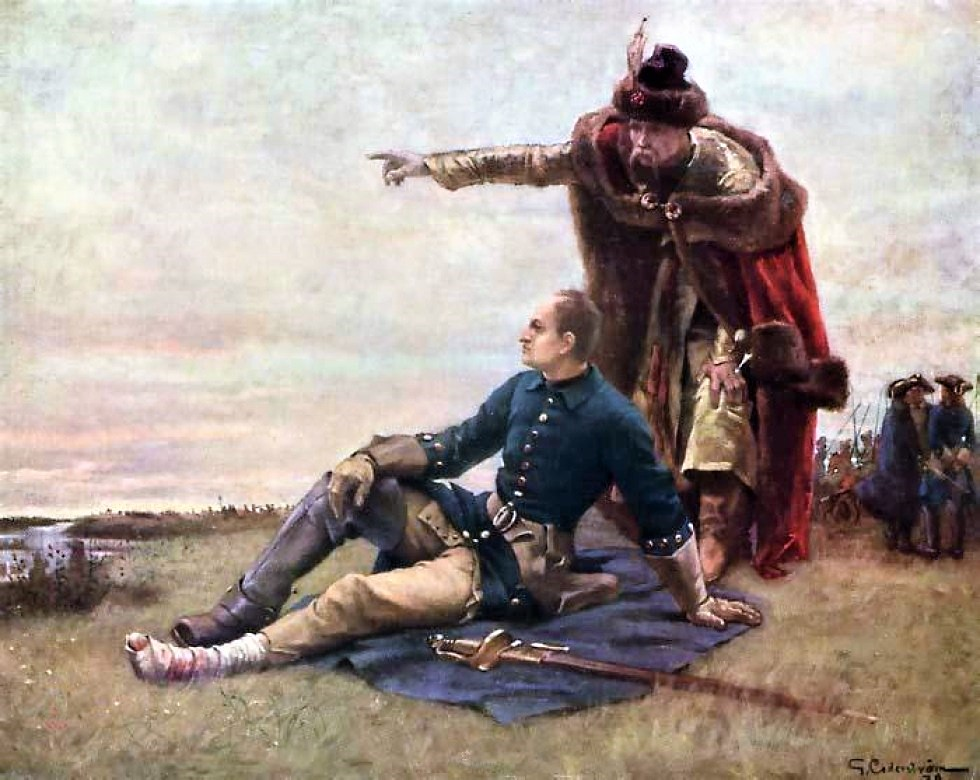
Charles XII and Ivan Mazepa by the Dnieper

The surrender at Perevolochna was the capitulation of almost the entire Swedish army on 30 June 1709 (O.S.) / 1 July 1709 (Swedish calendar) / 11 July 1709 (N.S.). It signified the virtual annihilation of the once formidable Swedish army after the defeat at Battle of Poltava, and paved the way for the eventual Russian victory in the Great Northern War. After the Battle of Poltava, Charles XII escaped to Moldavia, a vassal state of the Ottoman Empire.

== Background ==
Leaving Pushkaryovka around 7 PM on the 28th, the same day as their defeat, the remnants of the Swedish army head south following the west bank of the river Vorskla to the river Dnieper, reaching Stari Sanzhary 20 km to the south where the baggage wagons stopped until dawn while the artillery, treasure-wagons and troops continue on to Novi Sanzhary. The artillery reached Novi Sanzhary after midnight, Charles XII at 1:30 AM, and the troops at dawn. The Tsar Peter the Great sent Prince Golitzin's Semyonovskiy Regiment and Christian Felix Bauer's ten regiments of dragoons in pursuit.

The march resumed by 7 AM on the 29th, heading for Bjeliki, and Major-General Meijerfeldt is sent back to negotiate with the Tsar. The convoy linked up with Lt. Col. Silfverhielm's 500 men at Kobeliaky in the late afternoon. On 30 June, the convoy reached Tashtayka on the Dnieper where Axel Gyllenkrok had been sent earlier to prepare a crossing. However, Gyllenkrok wanted Charles to stop at Kishenka, and decide if they should cross the Vorskla at the ford and head into the Crimea, or head further south and attempt a crossing of the Dnieper into Turkey. Now the Swedes found the Dnieper river broad and swift, with few materials with which to build boats or a bridge. Ivan Mazepa and his men along with Silfverhielm's men crossed on the few boats available. Efforts to swim across ended in drowning for men and horse alike.

The Swedish command convinced Charles to save himself by crossing the Dnieper and heading for Ochakov, while the army, led by Lewenhaupt, would cross the Vorskla into the Crimea. About 3,000 crossed that day and night with the king, mostly officers and members of the royal household.

== Surrender ==
The dawn of the next morning brought news that a Russian corps of infantry, cavalry and artillery was deployed in a crescent shape, ready for battle, on the plateau above the river, about 9,000 men under the command of General Menshikov. The Cossacks, allied with the Russians, swept down to plunder the Swedish wagons. The Russian army advanced and blocked the road to Kishenka and a Swedish escape. The Swedish army now faced the sandhills and the Russian army on the plateau.

Lewenhaupt did not want to fight the Russians, instead sending the Prussian military attache to start truce negotiations. After conferences and voting among the higher officers, the Swedish army of 12,000 to 20,000 capitulated. The king departed the southern river bank at 9:45 AM while the announcement of surrender was made at 11 AM. The Russians executed the Cossacks allied with the Swedes, who were unable to escape across the Dnieper.

== Effect on the war ==
The surrender was a contributing cause to the Russian victory in the Great Northern War. The Swedish continental army had ceased to exist, leaving the remaining defenses of the Swedish Empire hopelessly outnumbered. Strategically, Russia now had taken the offensive, while Sweden would be hard pressed to muster a new army to defend itself. General Lewenhaupt was imprisoned and died in Russian captivity in 1719. King Charles did nothing to have him released, but fled to Bendery in what was then the Ottoman Empire.
