= Siege of Vepryk =

1709 siege of the Great Northern War

- Part of the Poltava campaign and the Northern War in Ukraine
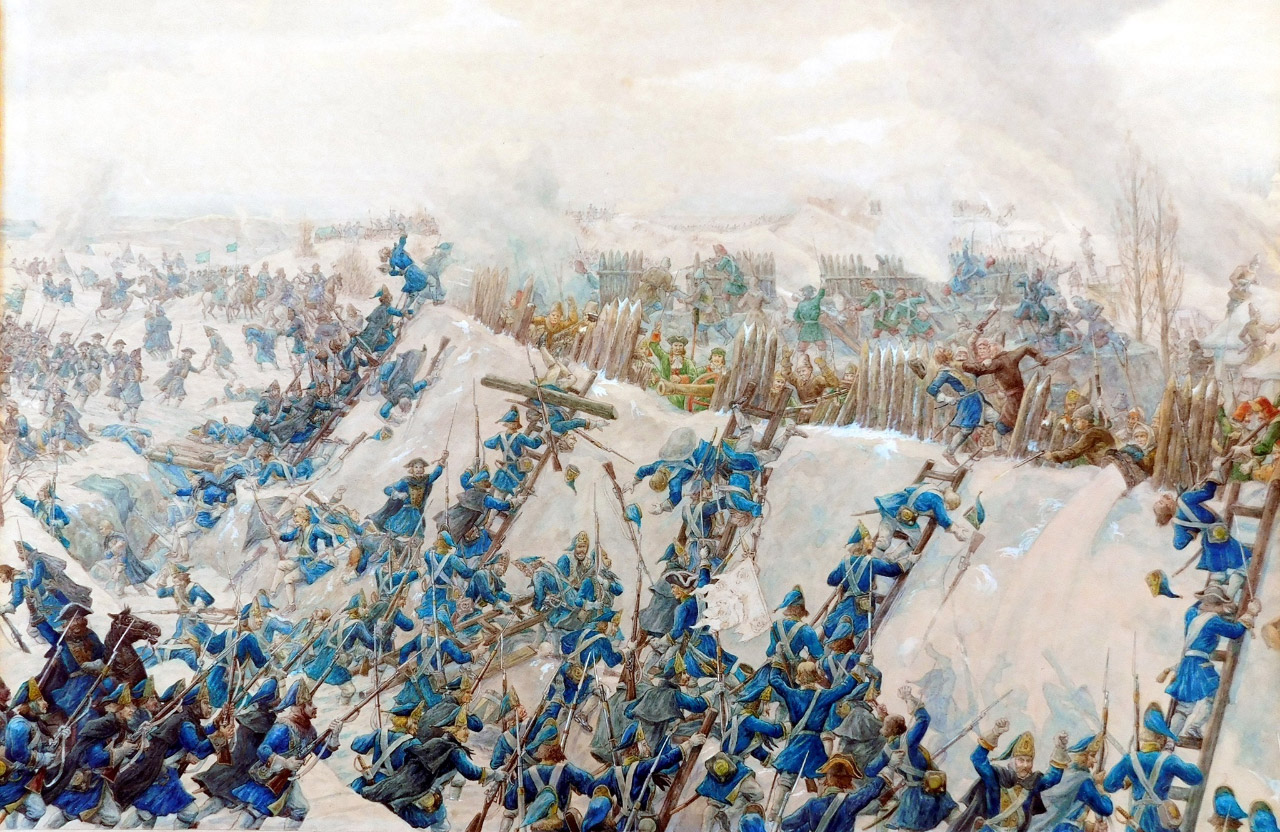
- The Swedish assault of Vepryk 1709
| Date | 3–18 January 1709 |
| Location | Vepryk, Cossack Hetmanate (now Ukraine) 50°22′0.8″N 34°10′35.4″E |
| Result | Swedish victory |

Belligerents
| Swedish Empire; Cossack Hetmanate | Tsardom of Russia; Cossack Hetmanate |

Commanders and leaders
| Charles XII of Sweden; Berndt Otto Stackelberg; Ivan Mazepa | Colonel Fermor |

Strength
| 3,000 | 1,500 |

Casualties and losses
| 400–1,385 killed 600 wounded | 1,500 killed, wounded or captured |

The siege of Vepryk or Veprik took place on 3–18 January 1709 during the Poltava campaign in the Northern War in Ukraine near the Ukrainian city of Vepryk. The town was defended by a garrison of about 1,500 men, from who 1,100 were soldiers of Pereiaslav Regiment and the rest were Zaporozhian Cossacks.

The Russian commander, the Scot Colonel Fermor refused to surrender, prompting Charles XII to start a bombardment of the town and later, on 17 January also an assault. After about two hours of intense fighting the Swedes and Cossacks of Mazepa pulled back, unable to capture the town. However, the Russians surrendered on the night of 18 January and the Swedes were allowed to march in. The result was a tactical success for the Swedish forces, but it did not greatly alter the strategic situation.

About 400 Swedes were killed and another 600 wounded. The Russian garrison had more than 170 killed and 150 wounded soldiers; the rest of the soldiers surrendered and became prisoners of war, sent to Zinkiv.

After several days Charles XII burnt down the empty fortress.
