= Kost Hordiienko =

Zaporozhian Cossack leader (died 1733)

Kost Hordiienko Кость Гордієнко
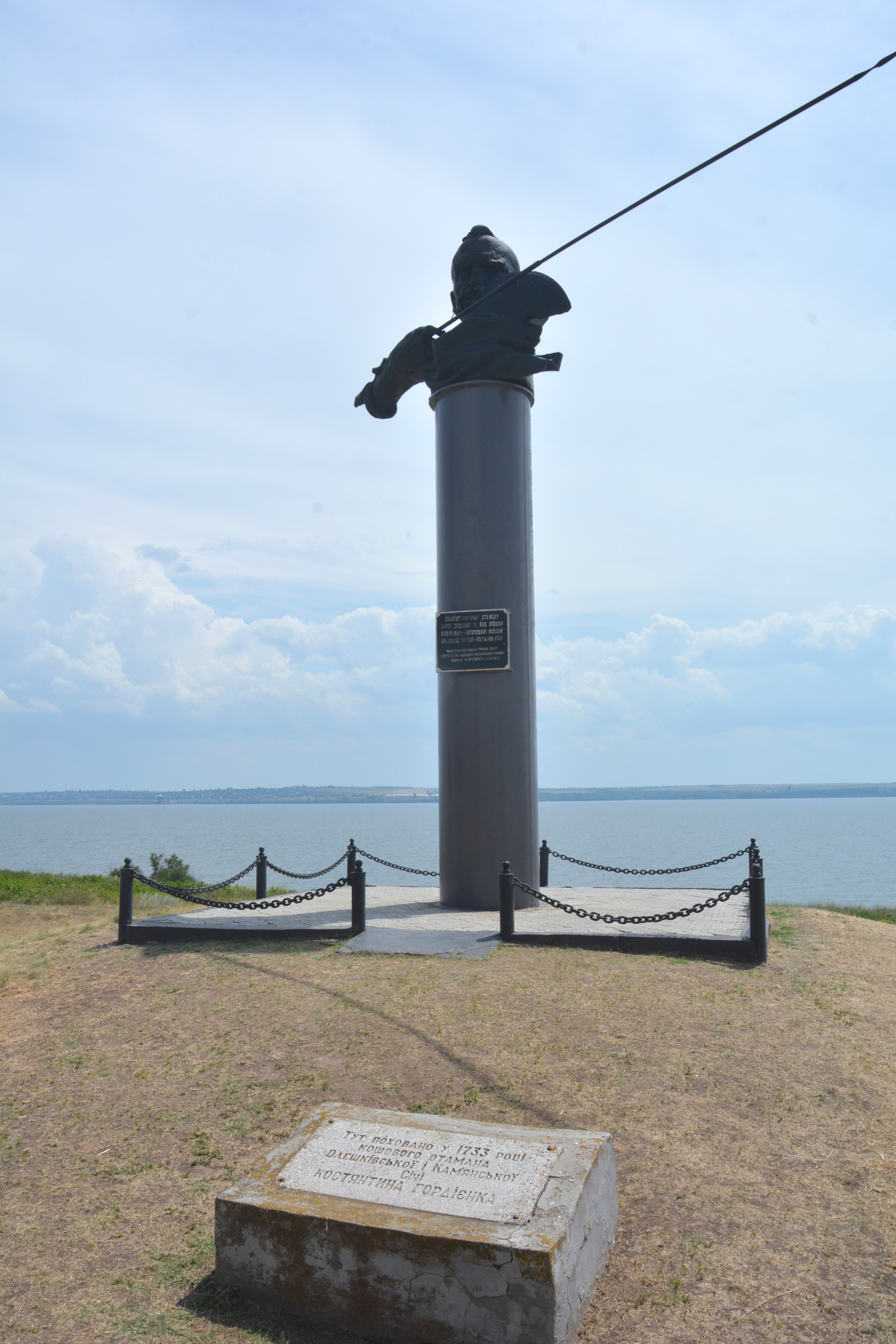

Kish otaman of the Zaporozhian Cossacks
- In office 1703–1728
- Preceded by: Petro Sorochynsky
- Succeeded by: Ivan Biletsky

Personal details
- Died: 15 May 1733 Kamianka Sich, Khanate of Crimea (now Ukraine)
- Religion: Eastern Orthodox
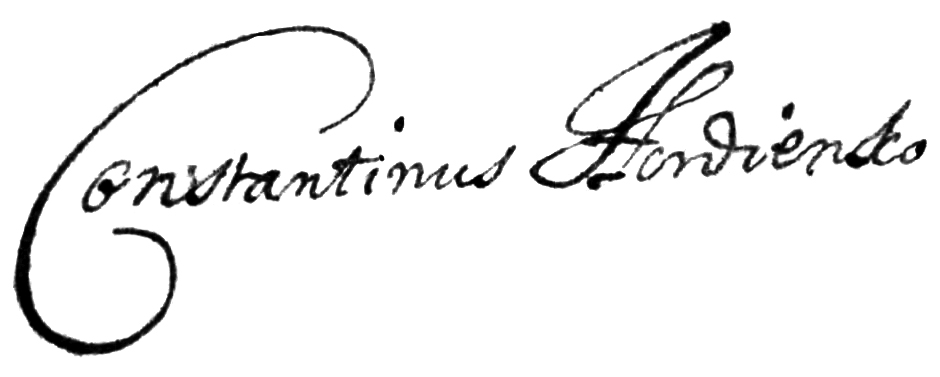
- Signature

Kost Hordiienko (Ukrainian: Кость Гордієнко; unknown – 15 May 1733) was a Zaporozhian Cossack Kish otaman at the Kamianka Sich. After 1709 he allied with Ivan Mazepa, and co-authored the Constitution of Pylyp Orlyk.

Hordiienko was born in the Poltava region, Hetmanate. He studied at the Kyiv Mohyla Academy. Later he joined the Zaporizhian Sich, headed the Cossack troops (1702–1706, 1707–1709, 1710–1728). As an ally of Mazepa, he fought in the Battle of Poltava.

On 6 May 2019, the 57th Motorized Brigade of the Ukrainian Army received the honorary name of Kost Hordiienko.

== Origin ==
"Kost" is a Ukrainian shortening of "Kostiantyn", ultimately derived from the Byzantine name "Konstantin". Dmytro Yavornytskyi, a Ukrainian specialist in the history of the Ukrainian Cossacks, believed that Hordiienko came from the Poltava region, while Apollon Skalkowski, a researcher of Polish origin, assumed that he was from Volhynia, from the Ukrainian noble family of the Hordyns. In favor of the first option, the fact that it was customary to attach the surname to the father's name was in Left-bank Ukraine, but not in Volhynia.

== Biography ==
Hordiienko studied at the Kyiv-Mohyla Collegium and later joined the Cossack army.

He was a Cossack of the Platnyriv kurin of the Zaporozhian Sich. Twelve times he was elected Kish otaman of Zaporozhian Sich. He held this position in 1702, from December 1703 to May 27, 1706, and from December 1707 to April 1709. In 1710–1728, he was the Kish otaman of Kamianka and Oleshky Sich.

Kost Hordiienko openly spoke out against the Russian oppression, openly defended the rights and freedoms of the Cossack army before Peter I, thus earning the trust and respect of the few Ukrainian Cossacks, who were not loyal to Russia

In 1702 Hordiienko sent a letter to the Russian Tsar Peter I, in which he wrote about the ownership of lands in Samara to the Ukrainian Cossacks, especially after the construction of the Kamianyi deluge fortress near Chortomlyk Sich. The refusal to swear allegiance to Peter I and the attempt together with the Crimean Khan Devlet II Giray to act against Moscow were motivated by the same. For this purpose, an embassy headed by Steblevskyi was sent to the Crimean city of Bakhchysarai. However, the Ottoman grand vizier Amcazade Köprülü Hüseyin Pasha did not approve of these plans, contributing to the overthrow of the Khan from the throne. Peter I sent his henchmen to Ukraine to persuade the Cossacks to depose Hordiienko, and in 1703 Herasym Krysa was elected instead.

Despite his personal dislike of Hetman Ivan Mazepa, in 1709 he supported him and joined his side together with the Cossacks. During the meeting with the Swedish King Charles XII, Hordiienko delivered a speech in Latin. He consistently advocated for the Swedish-Ukrainian union and against the attack of the Russians on the Ukrainian lands.

After the death of Ivan Mazepa in the city of Bendery, he participated in the drafting of the Constitution of Pylyp Orlyk.

Kost's son, Vasyl Hordiienko, was captured by the Russians after the Sacking of Baturyn and died shortly after his release. After the Battle of Poltava, the Russians intended to arrest him again, but, not being able to do so, they dug up and beheaded the corpse, after which it was hanged on a tree.

In 1711, Kost Hordiienko joined Pylyp Orlyk in a massive military campaign to liberate Ukraine from Muscovite occupation. Supported by a large force from the Crimean Khanate led by Khan Devlet II Giray, the coalition successfully rallied local Cossack regiments on the Right Bank who viewed Orlyk as the legitimate defender of their Volnosti and the true Hetman.

This maneuver was part of the broader Pruth River Campaign, during which the combined Ottoman, Tatar, and Cossack forces completely encircled Peter I and his entire army. While the liberation of the Right Bank ultimately stalled due to the withdrawal of Tatar forces and effective Muscovite religious propaganda, Peter I was only spared total defeat by negotiating the Treaty of the Pruth, which involved massive bribes to Ottoman officials that forced him to return key territories and dismantle his southern forts.

After the destruction of Kamianka Sich by the Russian punitive expedition of Sheremetev in 1711, Kost Hordiienko, together with the Ukrainian Cossacks, moved to the territory of the Crimean Khanate (the land at the mouth of the Dnieper), where he settled in Oleshky and founded the Oleshky Sich, which he headed until 1728.

After the exile of Pylyp Orlyk, in 1714 Kost Hordiienko assumed the post of Hetman Dubossarskyi (a title of a person responsible for Crimean Khanate-controlled territory of Ukraine). He repeatedly settled the conflicts of the Zaporozhians with the Crimean Khan and the Turkish Sultan.

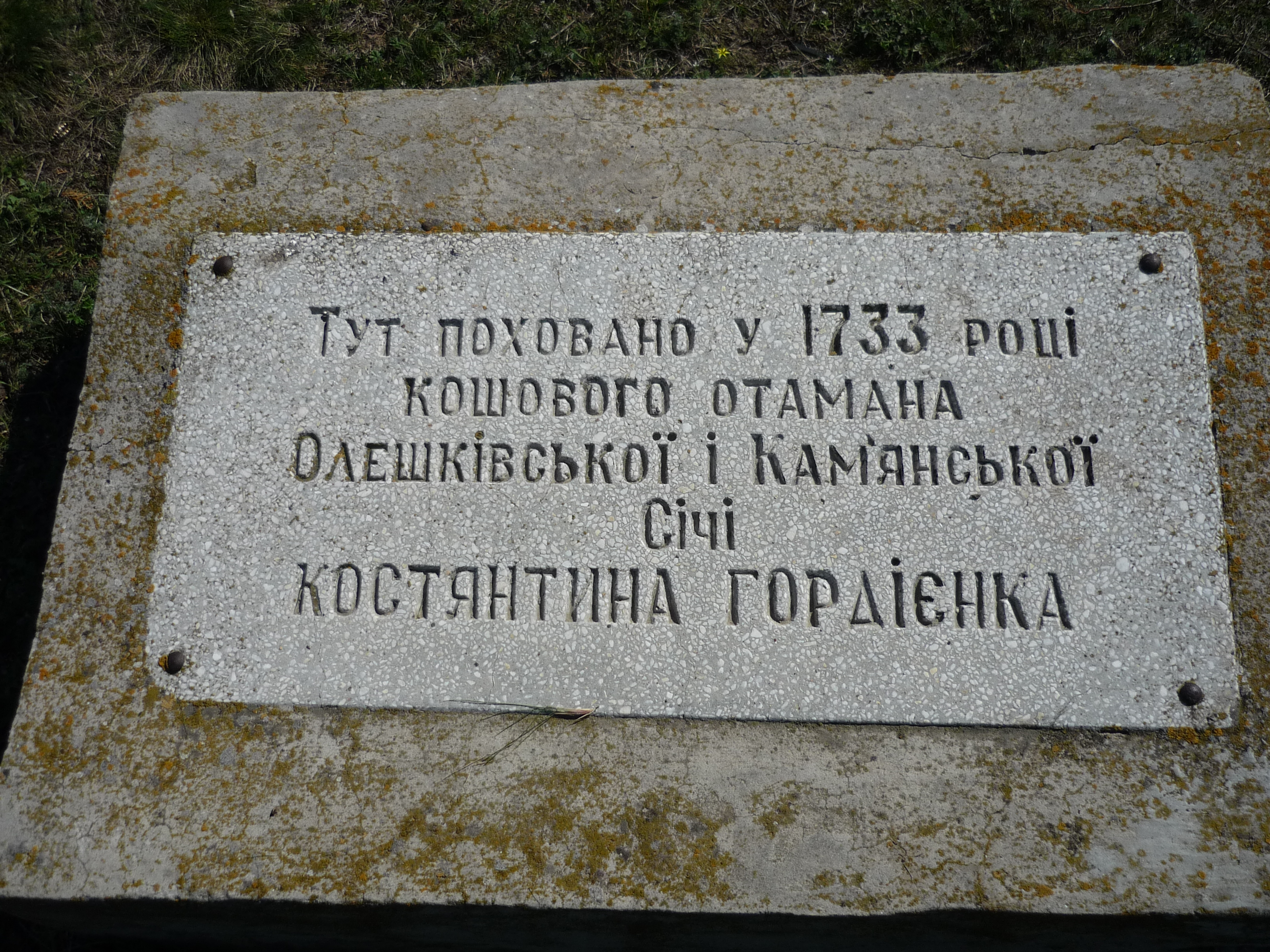
A slab on the grave of Hordiienko. Literally: "Here died in the year 1733 the kish otaman of the Oleshky and Kamianka Siches Kostiantyn Hordiienko".

Since 1729, he did not take part in political activities, but with his authority he restrained the Zaporozhians from returning to the power of the Russian government. He was buried in the Kamianka Sich.

== See also ==
- Ivan Mazepa
- Cossack Hetmanate

== Literature ==
- Kashchenko, Adrian (1919). Kost Hordiienko-Holovko – ostannii lytsar Zaporozhzhia. Vienna-Katerynoslav: Melantrykh. Archived from the original on 2020-02-17.
