= Swedish invasion of Saxony =

Invasion during the Great Northern War

- Part of the Great Northern War
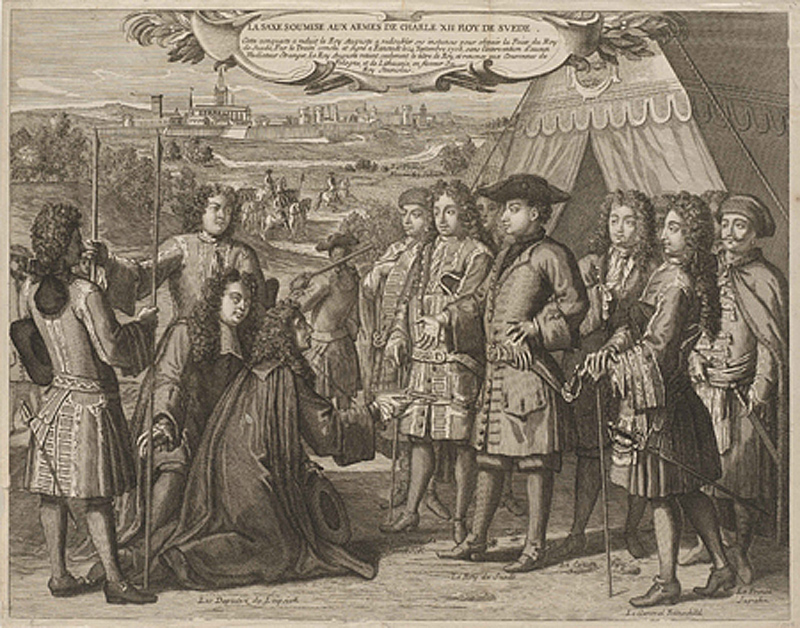
- Charles XII receives the keys to Leipzig
Date	6–24 September 1706
Location	Saxony, Germany
Result	Swedish victory: Treaty of Altranstädt (1706)
Territorial changes	Sweden occupies Saxony

Belligerents
(yes) Swedish Empire	Electorate of Saxony; Tsardom of Russia

Commanders and leaders
(yes) Charles XII of Sweden	Johann Matthias von der Schulenburg

Strength
20,000	7,000–16,000

The Swedish invasion of Saxony took place in 1706 during the Great Northern War, which began in 1700 when Russia, Denmark–Norway, and Saxony attacked Sweden or its ally, Holstein-Gottorp. To force Augustus II the Strong out of the war, who was the elector of Saxony and king in the Polish–Lithuanian Commonwealth, Charles XII of Sweden invaded the Commonwealth; Augustus was dethroned in 1704, and, after a devastating Saxon defeat at Fraustadt, Charles XII marched against Saxony in 1706 with 20,000 men.

The supreme commander, Johann Matthias von der Schulenburg, deployed the best of his 16,000 Saxon troops in Lower Lusatia. Charles XII, however, surprised his foe and marched through Silesia into Upper Lusatia on 6 September. Schulenburg withdrew as a result. Augustus, with no hope of victory, began suing for peace. Meanwhile, Charles XII marched into Saxony and bypassed the strongly fortified Dresden, capturing Leipzig on 19 September. Several smaller engagements were fought, ending in Swedish favour. Charles XII established his headquarters at Altranstädt, and the field army under Schulenburg was driven out of Saxony in the engagements at Ilmenau and Frauenwald on 22 September. The Swedes blockaded Dresden, which compelled the Saxons to sign the Treaty of Altranstädt (1706) on 24 September; Augustus had to renounce all his claims to the Polish throne and recognize Stanisław Leszczyński as king.

In Saxony, Charles XII replenished his army and waited for the Grand Alliance, concurrently fighting the War of the Spanish Succession against France, to recognize the peace. A dispute between him and the Holy Roman Emperor, Joseph I, brought the two rulers to the brink of war. It was settled with the Treaty of Altranstädt (1707) on 1 September, with Joseph making concessions. Charles XII departed Altranstädt the same day to begin the campaign against his last enemy, Peter I of Russia.

== Background ==
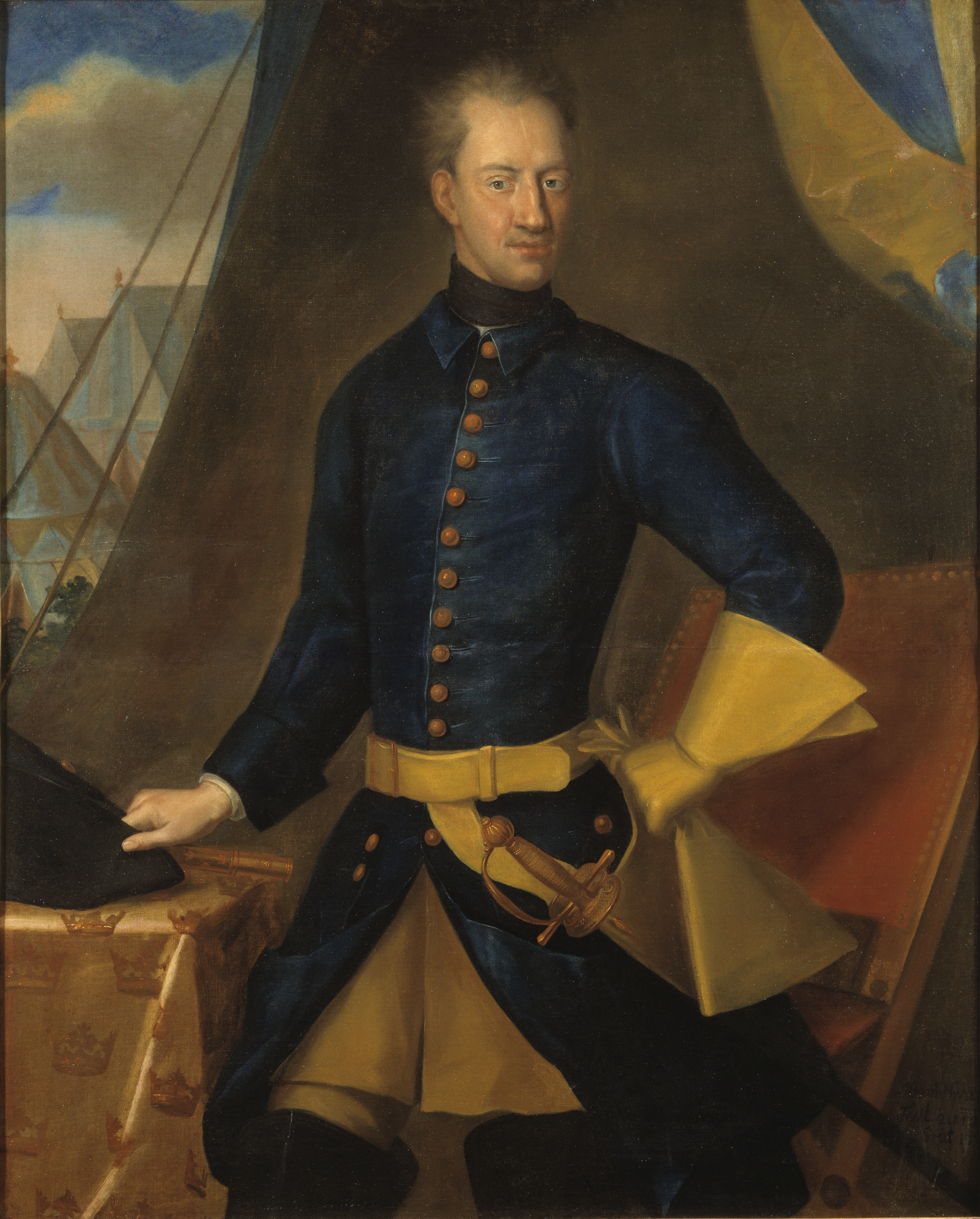
Charles XII at Altranstädt, by Johan David Schwartz

In 1700, the Great Northern War began when the anti-Swedish coalition, consisting of Frederick IV of Denmark, Peter I of Russia, and Augustus of Saxony and the Polish–Lithuanian Commonwealth, attacked Sweden and her ally Holstein-Gottorp. Denmark–Norway, besieging Tönning at the time, was quickly forced to sign a peace treaty following a Swedish landing at Humlebæk, combined with an offensive over the Bille. Russia's attack on Swedish Ingria and Swedish Estonia was subsequently repulsed in the Battle of Narva. The following year, Saxony's attempt at capturing Riga in Swedish Livonia culminated in their defeat at Düna. As the Saxons retreated, Charles XII of Sweden launched an invasion of the Commonwealth to dethrone Augustus II.

In 1704, Augustus was dethroned in favour of Stanisław Leszczyński, who was illegally installed by the Swedes; his coronation followed in 1705, after which a treaty between Sweden and Poland was signed. Augustus, however, continued to resist the Swedes as the Elector of Saxony—Charles XII had refrained from invading Saxony to avoid provoking the Grand Alliance (fighting in the concurring War of the Spanish Succession), who were guarantors of its integrity. Tsar Peter I, who had thus far committed most of his troops in the Swedish Baltic provinces, sent his main army into the Commonwealth in support of Augustus.

A grand campaign commenced, which culminated in 1706 with the decisive defeat of the Saxon main army at Wschowa (Fraustadt), while the Russians were starved out and defeated at Grodno. With the Russian army battered, and the Saxon army destroyed, Charles XII seized the opportunity to invade the severely weakened Saxony before the Grand Alliance could intervene—his position in Poland would deteriorate if the French setbacks at Ramillies and Turin resulted in peace. By conquering Saxony, he would gain a position of power against the Alliance and a place to replenish his army before an inevitable Russian campaign.

=== Prelude ===
After the defeat against Carl Gustav Rehnskiöld at Fraustadt on 13 February 1706, Johann Matthias von der Schulenburg had only 1,800 Saxon cavalry, 3,800–3,900 Saxon infantry, as well as 1,500 Russian infantry left to defend the Electorate; he hoped to increase his Saxon infantry to 9,000–10,000 men before the expected Swedish invasion. Augustus, whose aim was to unite forces with Schulenburg, withdrew with 8,000 cavalry to Kraków after his defeat. When Rehnskiöld broke up from Poznań in early summer, Augustus, now with 10,000–15,000 men, retreated to Lithuania.

On 17 July 1706, since having pursued the Russians from Grodno, Charles XII led his army from Yaroslavychi (Rivne Oblast) towards Greater Poland. He rallied with pro-Leszczyński forces at Włodzimierzówka (Volyn Oblast), before crossing the Bug at Horodło on 21 July. He reached Chełm on 24 July, passed Łęczna on 27 July and crossed the Vistula at Puławy, before encamping at Radom on 3 August. He continued his march past Nowe Miasto on 10 August, to Rawa Mazowiecka the following day. Augustus, realizing Charles XII's intentions, opened up for negotiations on 16 August. The same day, Charles XII reached Stryków and established connection with Rehnskiöld's army at Piątek. Their combined forces counted at most 24,000 Swedes. They marched into Greater Poland and over Warta on 23–24 August, arriving at Rawicz near the border of neutral Silesia (belonging to the Holy Roman Empire) on 31 August. Charles XII left about 5,000 men under Arvid Axel Mardefelt to protect Greater Poland along thousands of Polish pro-Leszczyński troops under Józef Potocki—only a small Polish contingent followed Charles XII into Saxony.

== Invasion ==
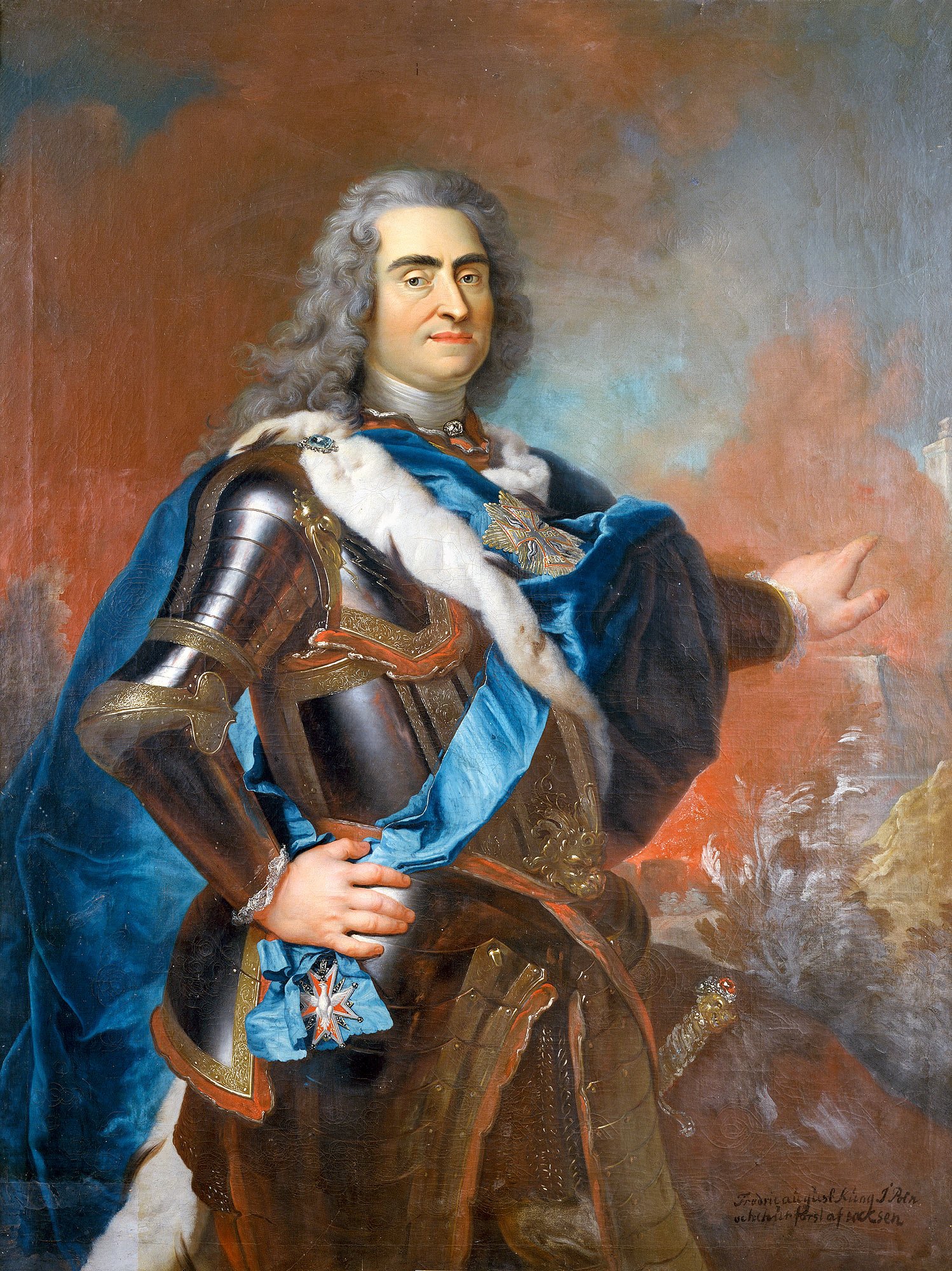
Augustus II the Strong, by Louis de Silvestre

At the time of the invasion, the Saxon defence consisted of 9,000 infantry (of which 4,000 were garrisoned in Dresden) and 2,000 cavalry and dragoons. There was also 5,000 land-militia and a few thousand experienced hunters, but their military training was considered inadequate. In total, there were at least 16,000, or 7,000 men of mixed quality, depending on sources. Schulenburg, anticipating a Swedish march through Lower Lusatia, assembled his regular troops there while most of the militia and hunters were sent to the garrisons in Dresden, Wittenberg, Leipzig with the Pleissenburg castle, and Königstein. Charles XII had roughly 250 of his own and Leszczyński's Drabants, 4,952 cavalry, 3,130 dragoons, 11,452 infantry, 200–500 Wallachian cavalry, (Note: The Swedish Wallachian-style cavalry, or Vallack cavalry, was initially a company raised by Magnus Stenbock in 1702 at Kraków, by orders from Charles XII; Polish noblemen, who were swift and skillful riders, were recruited to counter the light Polish cavalry that were harassing the Swedish army.) and 50 despatch riders available for the invasion. In total, about 20,000 men. There were also 48 guns with 800 artillery gunners present (paper strength).

Charles XII marched his army towards Upper Lusatia, to the surprise of Schulenburg. The unusually dry season would contribute to a swift Swedish advance over the rivers. On 1 September, the army broke into Silesia in two columns under Charles XII and Rehnskiöld. Charles XII rode in the vanguard, alongside his Drabant Corps and the Wallachians. He marched from Rawicz, through Wąsosz (Herrnstadt) and Krzelów (Krehlau), where the columns converged, to the Oder. An enemy outpost withdrew as Charles XII crossed the river at dawn the next day, (Note: Units crossing on 2 September: Wallachians (200); Drabant Guards (100); Life Dragoons (430); Life Cavalry (1,032); Kruse's Uppland Cavalry (512); Östergötland Cavalry (722); Nyland Cavalry (780); Småland Cavalry (700); South Scanian Cavalry (760); Dücker's Dragoons (500); Scanian Estate Dragoons (400); Swedish Noble Cavalry (446). 3 September: Stenbock's Dragoons (550); Taube's Dragoons (~600); Meijerfeldt's Dragoons (650); Västmanland Infantry (950); 1st Kronoberg Battalion (485); Södermanland Infantry (850); Närke-Värmland Infantry (1,250). 4 September: Foot Guards (2,010); Uppland Infantry (1,000). 6 September: Östergötland Infantry (780); Dalarna Infantry (950). 8 September: Leszczyński's Horse Guards (150); Skaraborg Infantry (930). 10 September: Jönköping Infantry (850); 2nd Kronoberg Battalion (485); Kalmar Infantry (912).) marching through Ścinawa (Steinau) to Dąbrowa Środkowa (Mittel Dammer). On 3 September, he marched through Lubin (Lüben), past Chojnów (Haynau), to Piotrowice (Petirsdorf). The following day, he went past Grodziec Castle (Gröditzberg) on his left side, to Brunów (Braunau). On 5 September, he arrived at Oleszna Podgórska (Krummöls) via Lwówek Śląski (Löwenberg).

Fruitless attempts were made by the ministers of Dresden to stop the Swedish advance by seeking the intervention of the Grand Alliance. Fearing pillaging, many Saxon inhabitants panicked at the news of the approaching Swedes. Charles XII issued letters of protection from Oleszna Podgórska on 5 September, declaring that no pillaging would occur as long as the inhabitants remained cooperative. To save his Electorate from destruction, Augustus encouraged the inhabitants to comply with Charles XII—most of them would open their doors to the invaders as a result.

On 5 September, Charles XII arrived at the border town of Gryfów Śląski (Greiffenberg), where he received a trumpeter sent by Augustus to convince him to halt his advance. The vanguard, however, crossed the border the same day. On 6 September, Charles XII crossed it by going over the Kwisa river (Queis) to Sulików (Schönberg), into Upper Lusatia.

=== Combat of Rosenhain ===
Upon realising the direction of the invading Swedes, Schulenburg ordered major general Jordan into Upper Lusatia to observe their movements and to overwhelm Charles XII and his vanguard if possible. His force consisted of Fürstenberg's and his own dragoon regiments, (Note: Nordberg mentions a total of 600 men, and Post- och Inrikes Tidningar 700. Adlerfelt mentions two regiments of 600 men each. Lyth mentions two regiments of 1,200 men in total, according to captured Saxon prisoners.) totalling 600–700 men. Against them, Charles XII sent Colonel Görtz, who had previously been in Saxon service, with 250 men of the Life Dragoon Regiment and the Scanian Estate Dragoons, as well as 50 Wallachians. (Note: Lyth mentions 200 dragoons from the Life Dragoon Regiment and the Scanian Estate Dragoons. Adlerfelt mentions 250 Swedes and some Wallachians. Nordberg mentions 250 Swedes and 500 Poles (Wallachians).) At the dawn of 7 September, (Note: 6 September according to Gretschel and Bülau, and 8 September according to Lyth.) Görtz found Jordan in an advantageous position behind a river, near Rosenhain and Radmeritz (between Löbau and Reichenbach). (Note: According to Post- och Inrikes Tidningar, the fighting occurred at Tepzel (on the other side of Görlitz). Gretschel and Bülau mentions Rotkretscham. Nordberg mentions Reihersdorf, behind Bautzen. Lyth mentions the estates of Rodens and Rosenkane.)

A squadron of the Swedish Life Regiment Dragoons charged over the bridge into the closest Saxon troops who were forming into battle, causing disorder. As Jordan attempted to restore order, he was recognized by Görtz, who chased after him among the fleeing troops and pierced him twice with his sword. Meanwhile, the rest of the Swedish force crossed the river and attacked, forcing the Saxons to retreat along the whole front; some fled to Bohemia, while most fled west over the Elbe river.

The Saxons left 94 or 96 men dead on the battlefield, with three banners and 36 men captured. (Note: Adlerfelt mentions 90 killed and more than 100 wounded. Lyth mentions 100 killed and 30 captured.) Many more were killed during the pursuit which extended for several miles; according to a list of casualties from Dresden, the Saxons had lost one captain, five lieutenants and second lieutenants, and 223 dragoons, with 80 men wounded. Their commander, Jordan, died of his wounds the following day. The Swedes had two men killed and seven wounded, (Note: Nordberg mentions two killed and three wounded Swedes. Lyth mentions five killed and three wounded Swedes.) among them the captain of the Life Dragoons who was mortally wounded. The Swedes gained several wagons of supplies and armaments which were meant for Dresden, as well as various fine horses. Schulenburg, having retreated west of the Elbe river, pulled his forces into the cities.

=== Capture of Leipzig ===
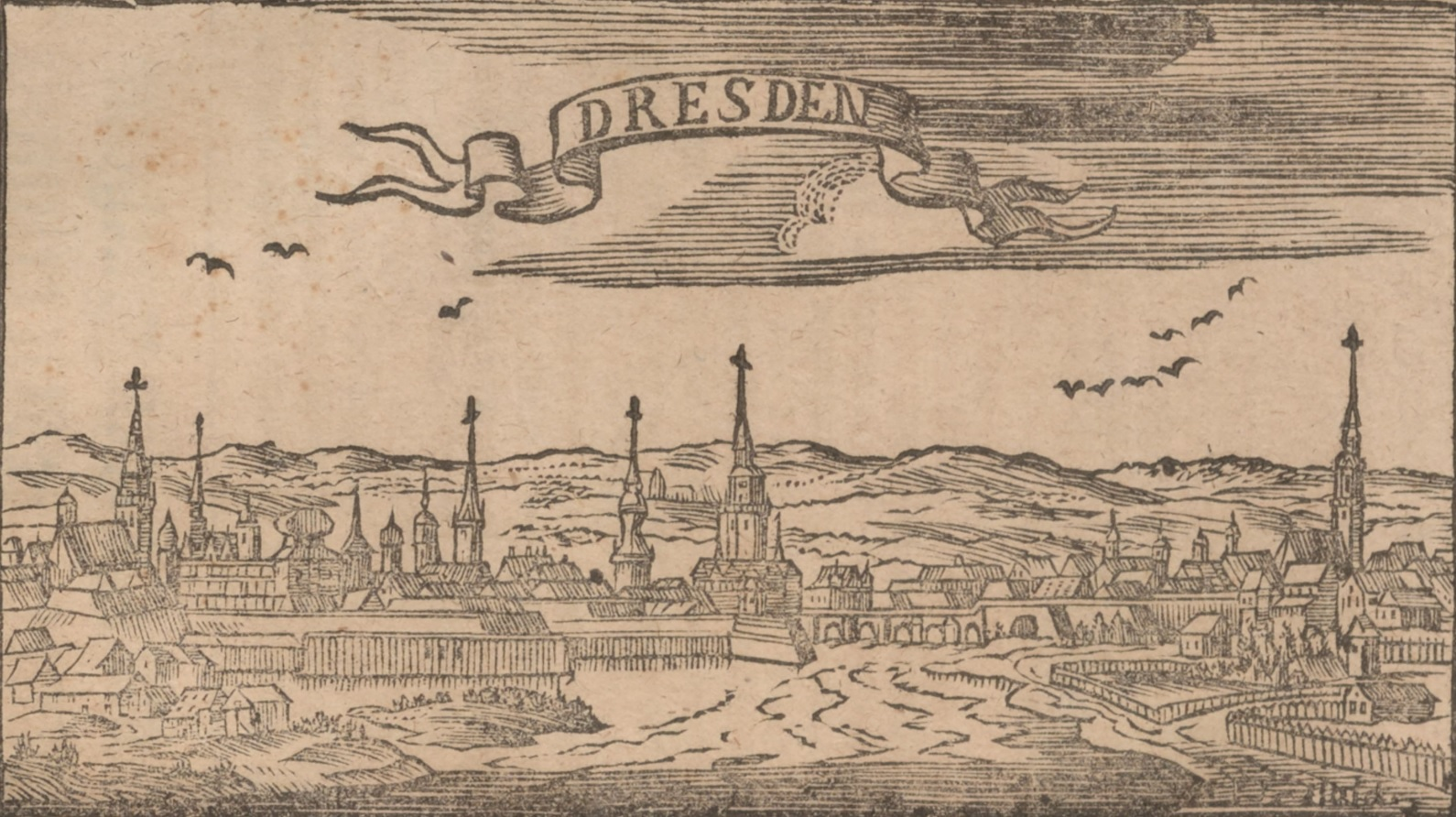
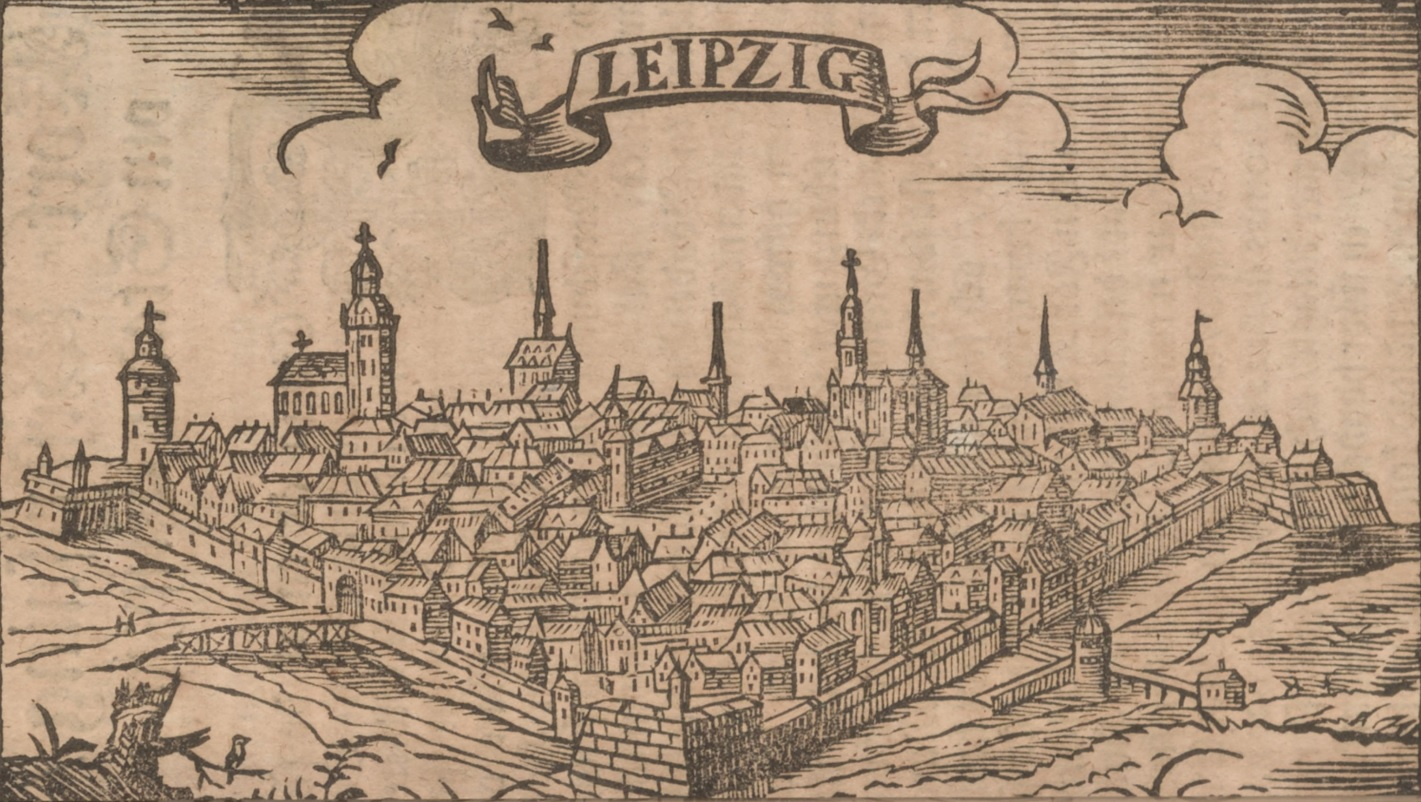
Engravings of Dresden and Leipzig in 1706, by Anna Maria Thelott

On 8 September, Charles XII marched past Görlitz to Markersdorf, towards Dresden. He went through Reichenbach to Kubschütz the following day. On 11 September, he bypassed Bautzen to Bischofswerda, where Augustus' Privy councillor Imhoff and Privy referendary Pfingsten arrived from Dresden to negotiate. Charles XII left negotiations to his ministers, Carl Piper and Olof Hermelin, and marched past Stolpen to Radeberg on 12 September. The next day, he sent Johan August Meijerfeldt southeast of Dresden, to Sonnenstein Castle at Pirna, while he bypassed Dresden to the north, now heading for Leipzig with its 1,600-man garrison. He arrived at Weinböhla on 14 September and crossed the Elbe river at Meissen the following day. The garrisons in Leipzig and Wittenberg evacuated, as the Saxon ministry commended Schulenburg to retreat with the army. On 17 September, Charles XII marched through Lommatzsch, Mügeln, over the Mulde river, to Grimma, where he received reports that Schulenburg's army was nearby. It consisted of 2,800 infantry, including 1,200 Russians, and 1,800 cavalry.

Charles XII sent Görtz with 950 cavalry and dragoons and the Wallachians to attack it, while he followed behind. Simultaneously, the main Swedish army proceeded to Leipzig. Schulenburg, retreating towards Thuringian Forest (Thüringer Wald) via Weimar and Erfurt, tried to save his army into the Holy Roman Empire. His vanguard reached Erfurt on 18 September but was denied entrance, as the city feared Swedish reprisals. His rearguard was caught up by the Wallachians at Weissenfels the following day, losing 20–30 killed and 36 captured against the loss of the Wallachian colonel. Near Naumburg, Görtz was ordered to keep pursuing Schulenburg while Charles XII departed for the main army. Another rearguard action was fought at Liebstedt, with more Saxon prisoners taken.

On 19 September, the Swedish main army marched through Naunhof to Taucha, from where Axel Gyllenkrok with an escort of 50 dragoons continued to Leipzig. The city opened its gates, except for the Pleissenburg castle with its 200–300 militia. They were made prisoners of war after a Saxon courier arrived from Dresden with orders to stop resisting. When Charles XII arrived the next day, he freed the prisoners and established headquarters at Altranstädt. To pressure the Saxon negotiators, he despatched orders for Meijerfeldt to initiate a proper blockade of Dresden. This compelled Imhoff and Pfingsten, who deliberately stalled the negotiations in hope of allied intervention, to sign the confidential Treaty of Altranstädt (1706) on 24 September. Two days later, a ceasefire was put into effect for 10 weeks, awaiting Augustus' ratification; Meijerfeldt was ordered to lift the blockade of Dresden, while a Swedish detachment marched to seize the undefended Wittenberg.

=== Combat of Frauenwald ===
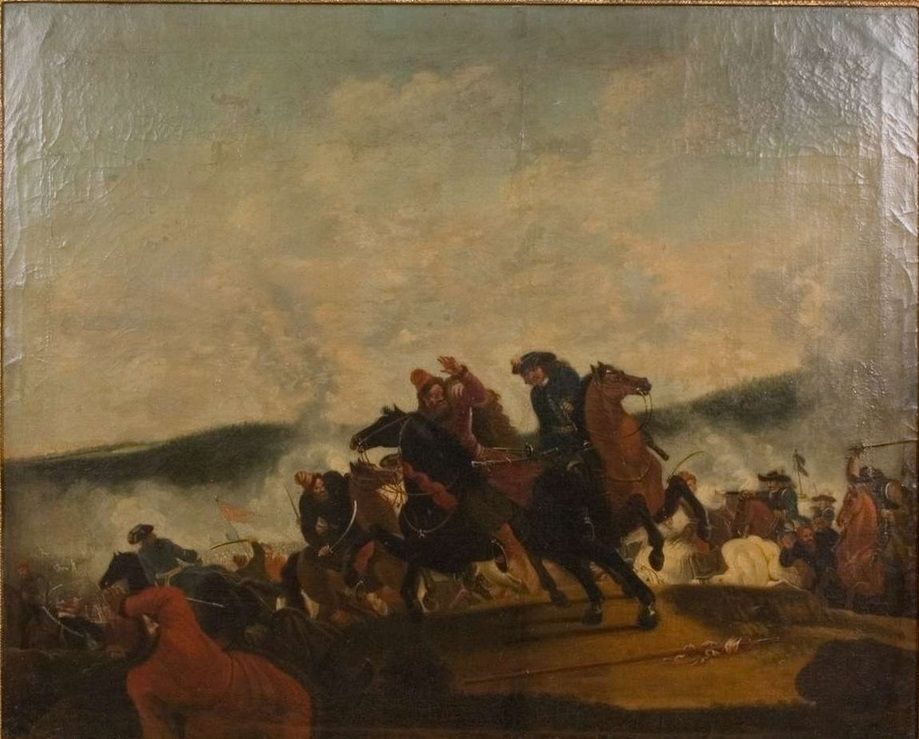
Cavalry skirmish, by Johann Philip Lemke

By nightfall on 20 September, Schulenburg's army assembled near Ilmenau. It counted 6,000 men after unifying with additional troops. On early morning the next day, the retreat continued towards Frauenwald. (Note: Schulenburg was at Arnstadt during this time. He had to disguise himself as a hunter and flee into the Thuringian Forest to evade capture when the Swedish vanguard appeared on 21 September.) The Saxon vanguard reached Coburg the same day. On the dawn of 22 September, Görtz arrived at Ilmenau and attacked the remaining field guards. Many Russians were killed or captured as they were chased into the Thuringian Forest, scattered into smaller groups.

Görtz then continued towards Frauenwald in pursuit of the Saxon rearguard. Its commander, Ludwig von Dünewald, barricaded 2,000 Saxons at Frauenwalder Pass, on the Meisen Hill (789 metres north of Frauenwald), to hold him off. He also sent a Swiss battalion of 500 men towards Neustadter Pass, (Note: According to Post- och Inrikes Tidningar, these were Frenchmen, counting 350 men.) a few kilometres to the east, to secure his flank. Later in the morning, Görtz ordered 150 dragoons to storm Frauenwalder Pass on foot. They were repulsed with many dead and wounded after hours of fighting. He then commanded half his force through the Neustadter Pass to circumvent Dünewald, (Note: According to Adlerfelt, Adlerberg had 200 men.) leaving Jöran Adlerberg with the rest to skirmish in his front.

Almost an hour later, in the early afternoon, Görtz stumbled upon the Swiss battalion in full march near Gießübel (Schleusegrund). He launched a mounted attack through the forest without success. The Swiss established a solid defence, forcing the Swedes to dismount their horses to attack. They advanced in the cover of the trees but were initially unable to dislodge the enemy. A request to surrender by Görtz was likewise refused. He then sent Ryttmästare Törnflycht to attack their rear, and prepared cavalry in the front. After an hour of fighting, the Swiss, attacked from all sides and with their commanding-officer wounded, threw down their arms and fled. (Note: Allegedly, the "Frenchmen" (!) cried out for quarter. However, because their fire seemed to intensify, or because their cries were mistaken for enemy reinforcements, the Swedes renewed their attack, surrounding them.) Darkness prevented Görtz from pursuing much further. He sent orders for Adlerberg to rendezvous with him at Ilmenau. The Saxon army broke up into companies, with some retreating towards Franconia, others towards Coburg and Bayreuth, while the battered Russians fled towards the Bohemian Forest. Most of their baggage was abandoned.

The Swedes reported a total loss of about 50 men, including three officers killed, and two officers with 37 lower ranks wounded. Other reports of Swedish casualties range from 20 in total, to two officers killed, four wounded, and 150 lower ranks killed and wounded.

News from Erfurt mentions 100 killed Russians near Ilmenau, and a Swedish report claims 30 captured. The reports also state that at least 80 enemies were killed at Frauenwalder Pass and Gießübel, and 47 captured, including one major and ten officers. In total, at least 100 captured and 130 killed since Ilmenau. No Saxon casualty reports exist, however, civilians estimate them to be at least 18 killed and 50–60 captured at Gießübel. An additional 60 wounded is plausible. Other estimates puts them at 18 killed and 50 wounded.

== Aftermath ==
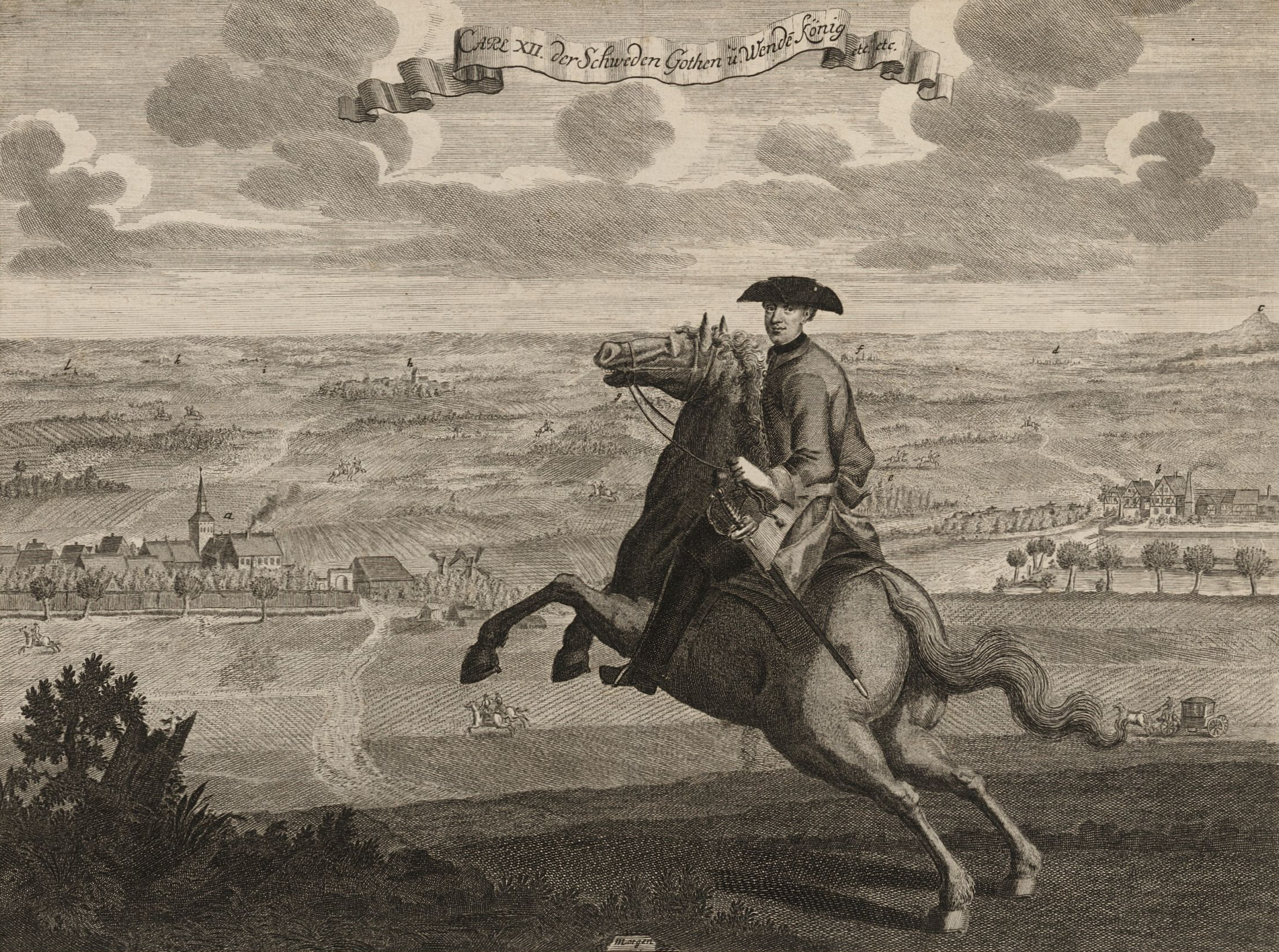
Charles XII in front of Altranstädt

Negotiations leading up to the Treaty of Altranstädt had been conducted in secret, according to the wishes of both rulers; Charles XII wanted to avoid foreign interference, while Augustus, remaining in the Commonwealth with his Russian allies, feared how they would react to such news. Accordingly, among other things, Augustus were to renounce all his claims to the Polish throne, recognize Leszczyński as king, and abandon the anti-Swedish coalition; James Louis Sobieski, the former pro-Swedish candidate to the throne, and his brother were to be freed from Saxon imprisonment; the Swedish traitor Johann Patkul and the Russians in Augustus' command were to be handed over to the Swedes; the Swedish army would be supplied with winter quarters in Saxony.

=== Occupation of Saxony ===
The estates in Saxony were forced to pay large contributions, while the Swedish regiments were spread out in several towns and cities all around Altranstädt. The army was replenished with recruits, mainly from Sweden but also Silesia. Its stay in Saxony remained mostly peaceful; some early atrocities were committed, especially by the Wallachians and other Poles, which obliged Charles XII to issue strict disciplinary mandates to his troops.

On 20 October, Augustus despatched letters from Pyetrykaw, Lithuania, in which he finally ratified the treaty in secrecy. On 29 October, however, while trying to hide his intentions from the Russians, he was drawn into a battle against Mardefelt's Swedish–Polish corps at Kalisz, which was destroyed. Charles XII, furious over this news, published the treaty on 26 November and demanded the release of the Swedish prisoners. Augustus then rode to Saxony, where the two rulers met for the first time on 17 December, at Günthersdorf. A new force of 8,000 men under Ernst Detlof von Krassow was sent into Greater Poland to protect it against the Russians.

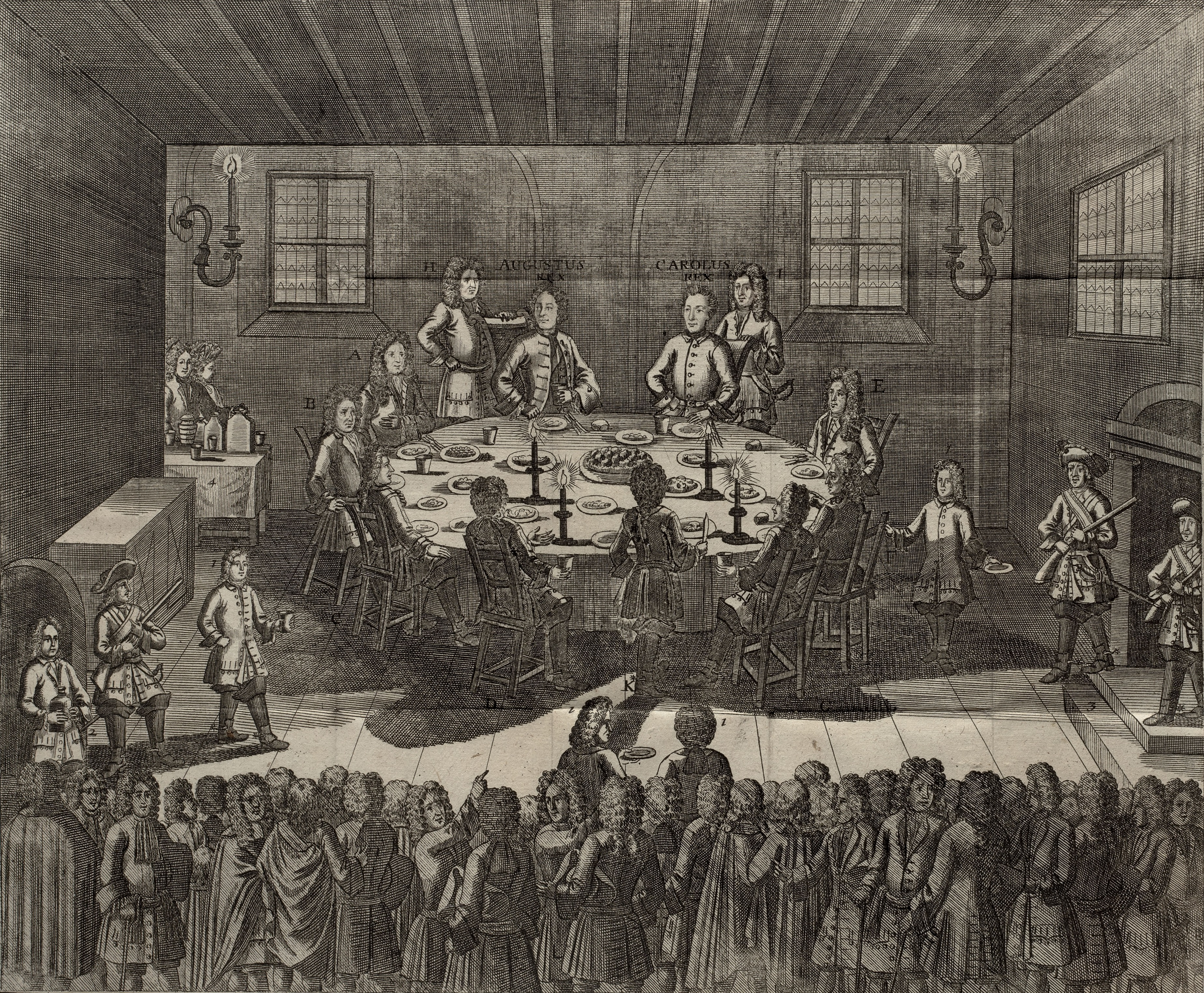
Charles XII and Augustus I at Altranstädt

Augustus had fulfilled most of the significant peace terms by the end of March 1707, apart from handing over the Russians. Before leaving Saxony, Charles XII called upon the Grand Alliance to recognize both the treaty and Leszczyński as the new king of Poland. The occupation gave him a certain power position, since the Alliance had to commit troops to the Saxon border, which restrained their war efforts against France. In 1707, Prussia and Hannover, followed by the Holy Roman Emperor Joseph I and several minor German princes, recognized Leszczyński.

A dispute between Charles XII and Joseph I soon arose, mainly concerning the Russians who had fled into Joseph's territory; Charles XII demanded their hand-over, according to the Treaty of Altranstädt. To avoid provoking the Tsar, Joseph secretly gave the Russians passports and instructed them to flee, before staging a fruitless cavalry pursuit. Charles XII, not fooled by the stunt, dismissed Joseph's ministers in response. The growing disaffection between the two rulers brought them to the brink of war; Joseph attempted to create a new anti-Swedish coalition, while Charles XII signed a defence pact with Frederick I of Prussia on 16 August.

The situation was resolved with the Treaty of Altranstädt (1707) on 1 September, as Joseph I's allies persuaded him into making concessions to speed up Charles XII's departure from Saxony. The Protestants in Silesia had their rights restored according to the Peace of Westphalia—it was a compensation for Joseph's failure to hand over the Russians. Furthermore, Charles XII was promised that England and the Dutch Republic would recognize the previous treaty. It is estimated that the Swedish occupation had cost Saxony 35 million Reichsthaler. Charles XII departed Altranstädt the same day, with an army that was well-rested and larger than ever before. The Russian campaign ended with its destruction at Poltava and Perevolochna.

== Engagements ==
Engagement	Swedish numbers	Coalition numbers	Swedish casualties	Coalition casualties	Result
Rosenhain	300	600–700	9	130+	Swedish victory
Weissenfels	200–500	?	?	56–66	Swedish victory
Frauenwald	1,000–1,500	2,500+	50–150	230+	Swedish victory

== See also ==
- Swedish invasion of Poland (1701–1706)
- Swedish invasion of Russia

== Sources ==
=== Bibliography ===
- Adlerfelt, Gustaf (1740). The Military History of Charles XII. King of Sweden. Vol. 2. London: J. and P. Knapton. OCLC 15007018.
- Beust, Friedrich Graf (1803). Feldzüge der Kursächsischen Armee (in German). Vol. 2. Hamburg: Sächs. Provinzial-Blätter. OCLC 163815275.
- Carlson, Ernst (1877). Om Karl XII:s vistelse i Sachsen 1706-7: Med särskild hänsyn till det nordiska krigets inverkan på spanska tronföljarstriden (in Swedish). Stockholm: Central-Tryckeriet. OCLC 1194168639.
- Czok, Karl (1987). August der Starke und Kursachsen (in German). Leipzig: Koehler und Amelang. ISBN 9783733800345.
- Faber, Samuel (1707). Der Ausführlichen Lebens-Beschreibung Carls des XII., Königs in Schweden (in German). Vol. 6. Frankfurt: Christoph Riegeln. OCLC 941485742.
- Grauers, Sven (1967). Karolinska förbundets årsbok 1967: Med Karl XII i Polen och Sachsen år 1706 (in Swedish). Stockholm: Karolinska förbundet. OCLC 936792147.
- Grauers, Sven (1977). Karolinska förbundets årsbok 1976: Svensk och polsk krigsmakt i sina inbördes relationer under det stora nordiska kriget (in Swedish). Stockholm: Karolinska förbundet.
- Gretschel, Karl Christian Kanis; Bülau, Friedrich (1863). Geschichte des Sächsischen Volkes und Staates (in German). Leipzig: J.C. Hinrich'sche Buchhandlung. OCLC 833621456.
- Grosser, Samuel (1714). Lausitzische Merckwürdigkeiten darinnen von Beyden Marggraffthümern in fünff unterschiedenen Theilen von den Wichtigsten Geschichten, Religions- und Kirchen-Begebenheiten, Regiments-Verfassung, Beschaffenheit der Schulen und Literatur, Landes-Art und Fruchtbarkeit, wie auch Gewerben, Handthierungen und Commercien, zulängliche Nachrichten gegeben, mit gehörigen Documenten und Anmerckungen bestärcket, wie auch gehörigen Kupffer-Blättern erläutert worden (in German). Vol. 1. Leipzig and Bautzen: David Richter. OCLC 1260332312.
- Heyn, Oliver (2015). Jahrbuch des Hennebergisch-Fränkischen Geschichtsvereins: Der Große Nordische Krieg im Thüringer Wald (in German). Leipzig: Salier. ISBN 9783943539592.
- Ihro Kön. Maj. von Schweden Hof- und Krieges-Staat (in German). Cölln. 1707. OCLC 166116478.
- Kling, Steve (2015). Great Northern War Compendium. Vol. 1. St. Louis: THGC Publishing. ISBN 978-0-9964557-0-1.
- Nordberg, Jöran (1740). Konung Carl den XII:tes Historia (in Swedish). Vol. 1. Stockholm: Pet. Momma. OCLC 256604521.
- Post- och Inrikes Tidningar (1706a). "Ordinarie Stockholmiske Post-Tidender: Af den 25 Septembris" (in Swedish). Stockholm. OCLC 660060850.
- Post- och Inrikes Tidningar (1706b). "Ordinarie Stockholmiske Post-Tidender: Af den 2 Octobris" (in Swedish). Stockholm. OCLC 660060850.
- Post- och Inrikes Tidningar (1706c). "Ordinarie Stockholmiske Post-Tidender: Af den 9 Octobris" (in Swedish). Stockholm. OCLC 660060850.
- Quennerstedt, August Wilhelm (1903). Karolinska krigares dagböcker jämte andra samtida skrifter (in Swedish). Vol. 2. Lund: Distribuent Gleerupska univ.-bokhandeln. OCLC 186563475.
- Sjöström, Oskar (2009). Fraustadt 1706: Ett fält färgat rött (in Swedish). Lund: Historiska Media. ISBN 978-91-85507-90-0.
- Uddgren, Hugo Edvard (1945). Karolinska förbundets årsbok 1945: Karl XII:s fälttågsplaner för åren 1705–1706 (in Swedish). Stockholm: Karolinska förbundet. OCLC 762341050.
- Velikanov, Vladimir S. (2018). Русский вспомогательный корпус на Польско-Саксонской службе в 1704-1707 и сражение при Фрауштадте [The Russian Auxiliary Corps in Polish-Saxon service in 1704-1707 and the Battle of Fraustadt] (in Russian). Russian Academy of Sciences: Ratnoe delo. Moscow: Русские витязи. ISBN 9785604015858.
