= Battle of Kalisz =

Battle in the Great Northern War

- Part of the Great Northern War
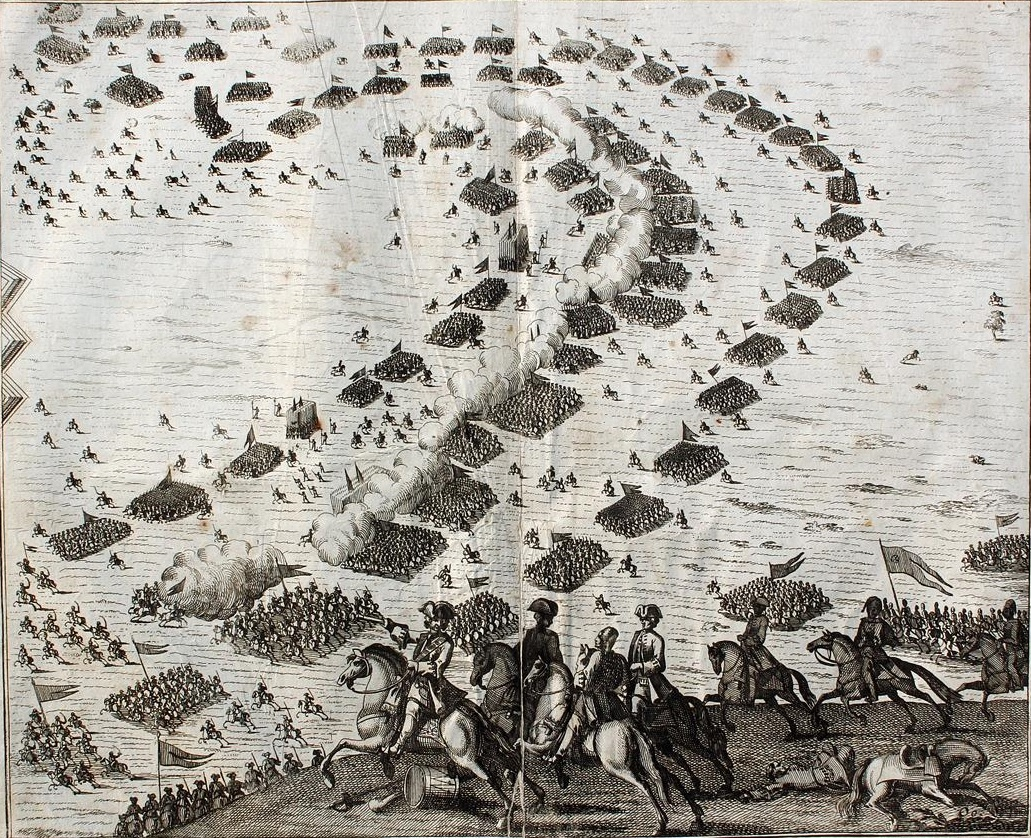
- Battle of Kalisz
Date	29 October 1706
Location	Kalisz, Polish–Lithuanian Commonwealth (now Poland) 51°45′27″N 18°04′48″E
Result	Anti-Swedish coalition victory
Territorial changes	Much of Greater Poland is temporarily occupied by the anti-Swedish coalition

Belligerents
Swedish Empire; Pro-Leszczyński forces	Saxony; Tsardom of Russia; Sandomierz Confederation

Commanders and leaders
(Sweden) Arvid A. Mardefelt (surrendered); Józef Potocki (surrendered); Kazimierz Jan Sapieha	(Electorate of Saxony) Augustus the Strong (Russia) Alexander Menshikov; Adam Mikołaj Sieniawski

Strength
12,000–16,360: (Sweden) 4,000–4,360; 9,000–12,000; (Sweden) or at least 12,000; 10 artillery pieces	32,000–36,000: (Electorate of Saxony) 5,000–6,000; (Russia) 18,000–20,000 (Note: Split into 8,000 to 10,000 Russian dragoons, 6,000 Cossacks and 4,000 Kalmucks); 9,000–10,000; 17 artillery pieces

Casualties and losses
4,000–5,740; See § Aftermath for more info	670–3,000; See § Aftermath for more info
- Location within Greater Poland Voivodeship Battle of Kalisz (Poland)

The Battle of Kalisz (Note: Russian: Битва при Калише; Swedish: Slaget vid Kalisz; Polish: Bitwa pod Kaliszem; German: Die Schlacht von Kalisch) took place on 29 October 1706 in Kalisz, Polish–Lithuanian Commonwealth during the Great Northern War. The battle was fought between an anti-Swedish army of Russians, Saxons and Poles led by Augustus the Strong and Russian general Alexander Danilovich Menshikov, and a Swedish–Polish–Lithuanian army headed by colonel Arvid Axel Mardefelt, loyal to Stanisław Leszczyński. The battle, which occurred as peace had been concluded between Sweden and Saxony, marked Sweden's only major defeat in Poland during the war and temporarily secured a major part of Greater Poland for the coalition. However, they failed to exploit their success as Augustus returned to Saxony soon thereafter to abide by the peace treaty, while Charles XII sent a new corps of 8,000 Swedes into Greater Poland.

== Background ==
As the Swedish main army invaded Saxony in September 1706 following the disastrous Saxon defeat at Fraustadt earlier that year, Charles XII of Sweden left a Swedish contingent of 6,000 men under Arvid Axel Mardefelt to protect Greater Poland in conjunction with Stanisław Leszczyński's Polish–Lithuanian supporters under Józef Potocki. The invasion forced Augustus the Strong, the elector of Saxony and previous king of Poland–Lithuania, to drop out of the Great Northern War and abdicate his claims to the Polish crown in the Treaty of Altranstädt, marking an end to the Civil war in Poland.

Augustus himself, however, was with the Russian commander Alexander Sergeyevich Menshikov and the third Russian army, which numbered 18,000 Russians. These were sent by Tsar Peter after the previous two had been defeated and dispersed after the battles of Fraustadt and Grodno. Augustus did not inform Menshikov of the treaty because of the large contributions from Russia, and tried to avoid a battle as he knew this would anger Charles XII.

When Potocki's Polish–Lithuanian forces were attacked by the Russians at Wielawa (or Piertkova) in mid-October, Mardefelt felt compelled to march to his support, leaving behind a regiment in Poznań.

== Battle ==
=== Armies ===
Mardefelt arrived at Kalisz with 4,000 to 4,360 Swedish troops, (Note: The Swedish corps consisted of, roughly estimated, the following troops: North Scanian cavalry regiment (880 men in eight squadrons); Krassow's dragoons (500 men in four squadrons); Muller's dragoons (600 men in five squadrons); Marshalck's dragoons (600 men in five squadrons); Pomeranian infantry regiment (600 men in two battalions); Görtz' [Bavarian] infantry regiment (600 men in two battalions); French grenadier battalion (290 men); Swiss infantry battalion (290 men)) including only one provincial regiment, with the rest being Germans and ex-prisoners of war taken at the Battle of Fraustadt of French, Swiss and Bavarian origin, now serving the Swedish cause. Mardefelt estimated that his Polish–Lithuanian allies under Józef and Michał Potocki, who had by now rendezvoused with him, fielded 12,000 men. However, according to the historians Jan Wimmer, Zbigniew Chmiel, and Sven Grauers, their actual strength was closer to 9,000–10,000 men. These Polish and Lithuanian troops lacked both proper equipment and training. Before the battle, Menshikov overestimated the number of his foes to 8,000 Swedes and 15,000 pro-Leszczyński forces.

The anti-Swedish coalition fielded an army twice as large, with 5,000–6,000 Saxons under Augustus (de facto Michał Brandt), 8,000–10,000 Russian dragoons with 6,000 Cossack and 4,000 Kalmuck irregulars under Menshikov, as well as 9,000–10,000 Polish troops of the Sandomierz Confederation still loyal to Augustus, under Adam Mikołaj Sieniawski, Stanisław Mateusz Rzewuski and Adam Śmigielski. The Swedish side overestimated the size of the coalition forces to at least 40,000, which is evident by a letter major general Ernst Detlof von Krassow sent to Charles XII after the battle.

=== Before the battle ===
Augustus secretly sent letters to the Swedish major general Mardefelt, declaring that a peace treaty was concluded of which he expected further news from Charles XII, and that a battle should thus be avoided. Marderfelt, however, had either not received Augustus' letters – the couriers were likely killed by Cossacks – or disregarded them as yet another of Augustus' deceits and replied that he had not received any confirmation of the peace treaty and would stand his ground in the case of a battle. In reality, he was more concerned than he wished to admit.

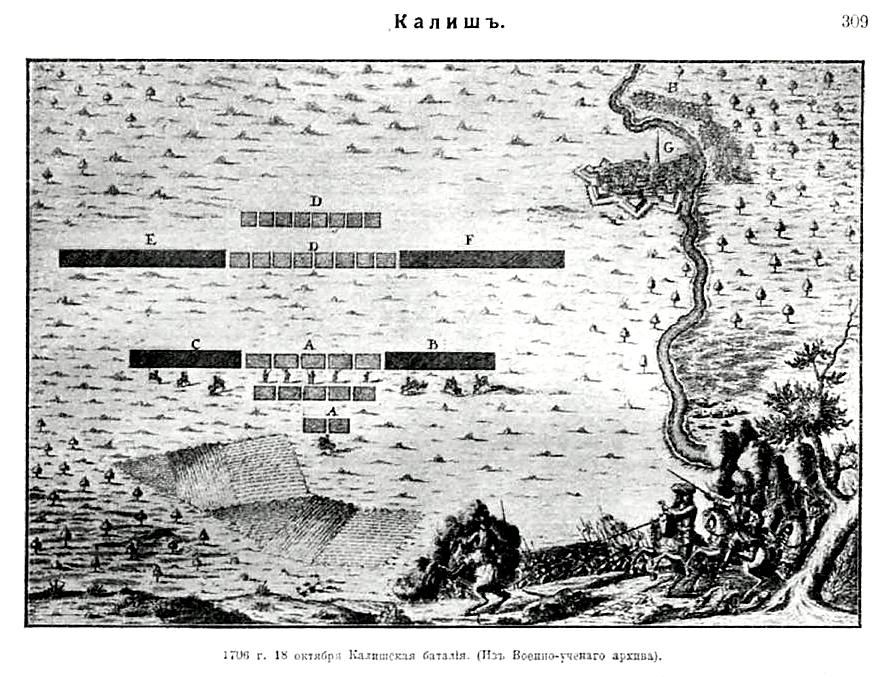
The location of the enemies in the Battle of Kalisz

Mardefelt did not wish to engage the much larger coalition army, but the commander of the Polish crown army, Józef Potocki, insisted on chasing the Russians out of the country. Mardefelt reminded him that the Poles had not been keen on fighting Russians or anyone at all during the war, but Potocki convinced him that this time they would fight to the last drop of blood. Augustus, not wanting to fight on the part of the coalition since he doubted any game-changing results could be won by defeating Mardefelt's small corps, tried to persuade him to retreat; because of his actions – or lack thereof – the battle began when it got dark.

=== Climax ===
The battle began with a mutual offensive by Potocki Polish infantry and coalition forces, the Polish forces were immediately overturned and the Swedes joined the battle, their actions were much more effective, but they lost the backbone of their troops. The Swedes captured the first line of defense of the Russians, but they quietly retreated with almost no losses, but this success was overestimated, the Swedish commander had already written a letter to Karl that he had defeated the coalition.

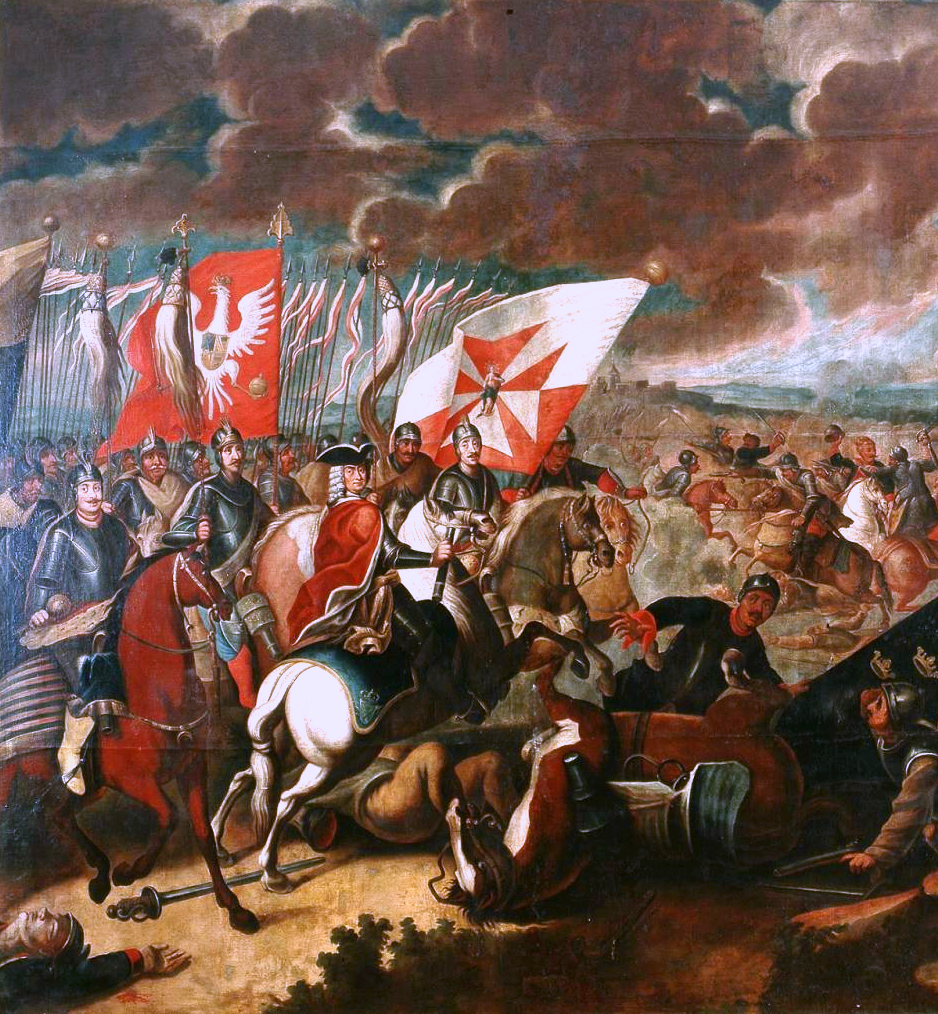
Augustus the Strong at the Battle of Kalisz

In fact, the battle was in full swing, the Swedish cavalry, pursuing the Saxons, broke away from the infantry and Russian forces entered this breakthrough, encircling most of the Swedish cavalry, this presaged the outcome of the battle. At this time, Augustus' forces pursued Potocki, but as soon as they caught up with them, they were released without a fight. When the Swedish dragoons died, all the Russian forces attacked the Swedish infantry, they lined up in a square and refused to surrender, but they began to throw grenades and fire from artillery, the Bavarian units surrendered first, the Swedish units resisted the longest, but there was no hope and Rene forced Mardefelt to capitulated.

== Aftermath ==
Estimates of losses for the Swedish side ranges from 1,400–2,000 killed or wounded and 2,600–2,900 captured, to 3,000 killed and 2,740 captured. It was also noticed that the Swedes lost 54 flags and 5 standards. The official Swedish estimate of their own losses is 700 killed and 1,800 captured, while Russian historian Vladimir Artamonov puts them at 1,260 killed and 2,598 captured – 1,769 of which were taken by the Russians, who inflicted the greatest losses on them. Artamonov's estimation of killed Swedes founds itself on 500 men under von Krassow who presumably managed to escape. Chmiel makes a similar calculation, but estimates that up to 1,000 Swedes out of 4,350 escaped, thus concluding that 780 were killed and the rest captured. The pro-Leszczyński Polish and Lithuanian forces suffered at least 1,000 captured, with an unknown amount of killed. Losses for the coalition forces are estimated at 670 (450 Russians, 150 Saxons and 70 Poles) to 1,000 or 3,000 killed and wounded. Of these, the Russians alone suffered anything from 84 killed and 324 wounded, to 500 killed and 800 wounded.

The battle ended in a complete defeat for Sweden and its Polish-Lithuanian allies, with a major part of Greater Poland falling into the hands of the coalition forces as a result. It marked Sweden's only major defeat in Poland and was, according to Artamonov, ensured by the actions of the Russian troops and their training. It was, however, rendered moot when Charles XII exposed Augustus' ratification of the Altranstädt treaty, whereupon the latter gave in to obey by its terms and withdrew to Saxony by November. A new Swedish corps of 8,000 men was sent into Greater Poland to protect it against the Russians. The Swedish prisoners taken in the battle, of which the majority had been passed over to Augustus from Menshikov with promises of a prisoner exchange, were unconditionally released to Charles XII.

== Bibliography ==
- Frost, Robert I (2000). The Northern Wars. War, State and Society in Northeastern Europe 1558-1721. Longman. ISBN 978-0-582-06429-4.
- Shkvarov, Alexei (2012). Россия и Швеция. История военных конфликтов 1142-1809 [Russia and Sweden. The history of military conflicts 1142-1809] (in Russian). Saint-Petersburg: RME Group Oy:Алетейя. ISBN 978-5-91419-754-1.
- Artamonov, Vladimir (2008). Калишская баталия 18 октября 1706 года [The Battle of Kalisz on October 18, 1706] (in Russian). Цейхгауз. ISBN 978-5-9771-0079-3.
- Egorshina, O.; Petrova, A. (2023). История русской армии [The history of the Russian Army] (in Russian). Moscow: Edition of the Russian Imperial Library. ISBN 978-5-699-42397-2.
- Wimmer, Jan (1961). "The Battle of Kalisz, Oct. 29, 1706" (PDF). Um Die Polnische Krone : Kalisch, J. and J. Gierowski. Translated by D. Allen, Mitchell. Archived from the original (PDF) on 4 Jun 2015.
- Englund, Tomas (2004). "Norra skånska kavalleriregementet och den olyckliga bataljen vid Kalisz 1706" [Norra skånska cavalry regiment and the unfortunate battle at Kalisz 1706]. Den skånske dragonen : Tidskrift för Skånska Dragonernas Kamratförening (in Swedish). Hässleholm: Jan Anderson.
- Kling, Steve; Chmiel, Zbigniew (2015). Great Northern War Compendium : The Battle of Kalisz 1706. Vol. 1. St. Louis: THGC Publishing. ISBN 978-0-9964557-0-1.
- Grauers, Sven (1977). Karolinska förbundets årsbok 1976: Svensk och polsk krigsmakt i sina inbördes relationer under det stora nordiska kriget (in Swedish). Stockholm: Karolinska förbundet.
- Adlerfelt, Gustaf (1740). The Military History of Charles XII. King of Sweden. Vol. 2. London: J. and P. Knapton. OCLC 15007018.
- Kuvaja, Christer (2008). Karolinska krigare 1660–1721 (in Swedish). Helsingfors: Schildts Förlags AB. ISBN 978-951-50-1823-6.
- Artamonov, Vladimir (18 December 2013). "«Полтавское сражение». Глава II. Предвестница Полтавы - виктория при Калише" ["The Battle of Poltava". Chapter II. - "The Harbinger of Poltava - the Victory at Kalisz] (in Russian). Archived from the original on 24 December 2022.
- Gordon, Alexander (1755). The History of Peter the Great, Emperor of Russia: To which is Prefixed a Short General History of the Country from the Rise of that Monarchy : and an Account of the Author's Life. London: F. Douglass and W. Murray. OCLC 907922720.
- Bodart, Gaston (1908). Militär-historisches Kriegs-Lexikon (1618–1905) (in German). C. W. Stern.
- Robert K. Massie: Peter the Great
