= Invasion of Saxony =

Invasion of Saxony may refer to:

- The Saxon Wars (772–804), the conquest of Saxony by Charlemagne.
- The Swedish invasion of Saxony (1706), during the Great Northern War
- The Invasion of Saxony in 1756 during the Third Silesian War.
