= Treaty of Altranstädt =

Treaty of Altranstädt may refer to

- Treaty of Altranstädt (1706), a peace treaty between Saxony, Poland-Lithuania and Sweden, including the abdication of Augustus the Strong
- Treaty of Altranstädt (1707), a Swedish-Habsburg convention regarding Silesian Protestants
