= Rennsteig (Verwaltungsgemeinschaft) =

Coordinates: 51°25′N 10°42′E

Rennsteig is a former Verwaltungsgemeinschaft ("collective municipality") in the district Ilm-Kreis, in Thuringia, Germany. The seat of the Verwaltungsgemeinschaft was in Schmiedefeld am Rennsteig. It was disbanded in January 2019.

The Verwaltungsgemeinschaft Rennsteig consisted of the following municipalities:

1. Frauenwald
2. Schmiedefeld am Rennsteig
3. Stützerbach
