= Arvid Axel Mardefelt =

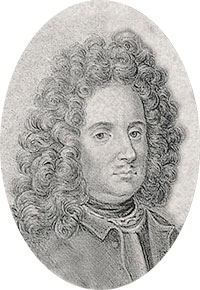
- Arvid Axel Mardefelt by an unknown artist
- Born: 1655
- Died: 18 May 1708; Ziönloffkoff, Lithuania
- Burial place: Vilnius, Lithuania
- Spouse: Catharina von Wedeman
- Children: Axel Mardefelt; Anna Catharina; Mardefelt; Carl Gustaf Mardefelt
- Relatives: Conrad Mardefelt (father), Lucia Catharina Theophili (mother)
- Military career
- Allegiance: Sweden
- Branch: Infantry
- Service years: 1677–1708
- Rank: General
- Commands: Södermanland Regiment
- Conflicts: Scanian War; Battle of Landskrona; Second Battle of Kristianstad; Great Northern War; Battle of Poznań; Battle of Fraustadt; Battle of Kalisz (surrendered)

Freiherr Arvid Axel Mardefelt (around 1655 – 18 May 1708) was a Swedish Infantry General and an acquaintance of Charles XII of Sweden during the Great Northern War.

== Biography ==
Mardefelt was the son of Field Marshal Conrad Mardefelt. In 1702, during the Great Northern War, he was in charge of the operations of the Swedish Army in Western Poland, and in 1704, he conquered Poznań. In 1706, he distinguished himself in the Battle of Fraustadt.

On 29 October 1706, he and his army of 5,000 Swedish and 10,000 Polish Soldiers faced an army of 35,000 Russian, Saxon and Polish troops under August the Strong at the Battle of Kalisz and were defeated. His Polish cavalry under Stanisław Leszczyński Grand Duke of Lithuania, was routed. Mardefelt together with 100 officers, including Polish Magnates, became a prisoner of war. After his release in 1707, Mardefelt died of gout in Ziönloffkoff, Lithuania.
