= Conrad Mardefelt =

Swedish Field Marshal

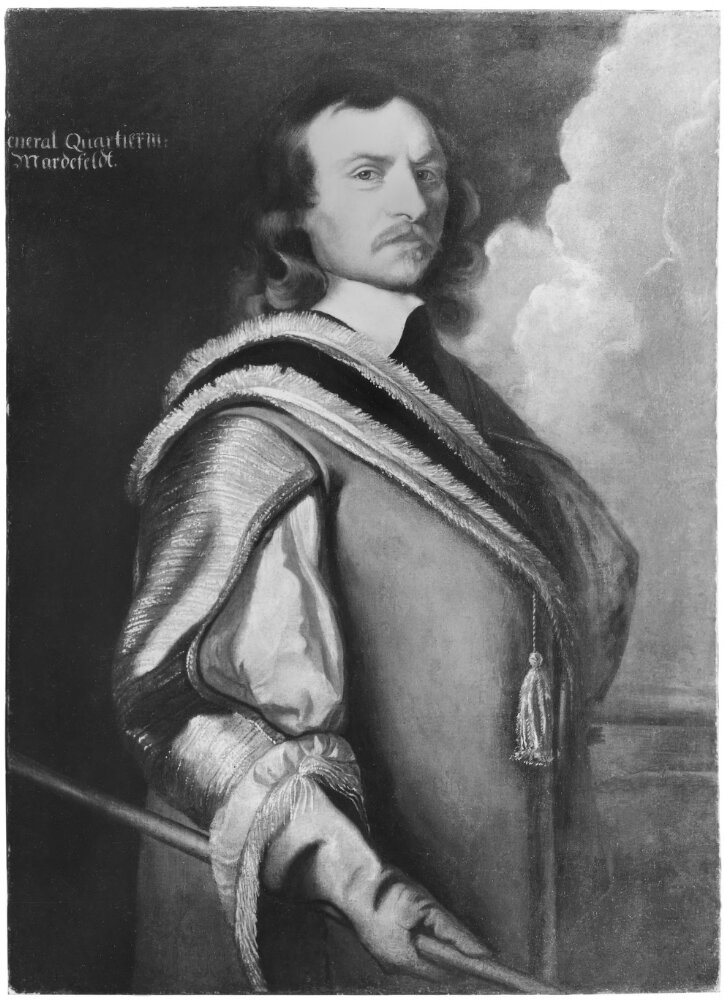
Conrad Mardefelt x M Merian dy.jpg

Baron Conrad Mardefelt, formally Conrad von Maesberg, friherre Marderfelt (c. 1610–1688) was a field marshal of Sweden. He was a nobleman of Pomeranian origin.

After having distinguished himself as a fortification officer with Lennart Torstensson, he was entrusted with the command of all the Swedish fortifications on German soil in 1646. He became a general in 1673 and a field marshal in 1675.

King Charles XI created him a freiherr in 1677 with the baronial name Marderfelt (from which some literature has tended to drop one "r").

He was the father of Arvid Axel Mardefelt.

== Sources ==
- The article Conrad Mardefelt in Nationalencyklopedin (1994).
