= Johan August Meijerfeldt the Elder =

Swedish general and civil servant

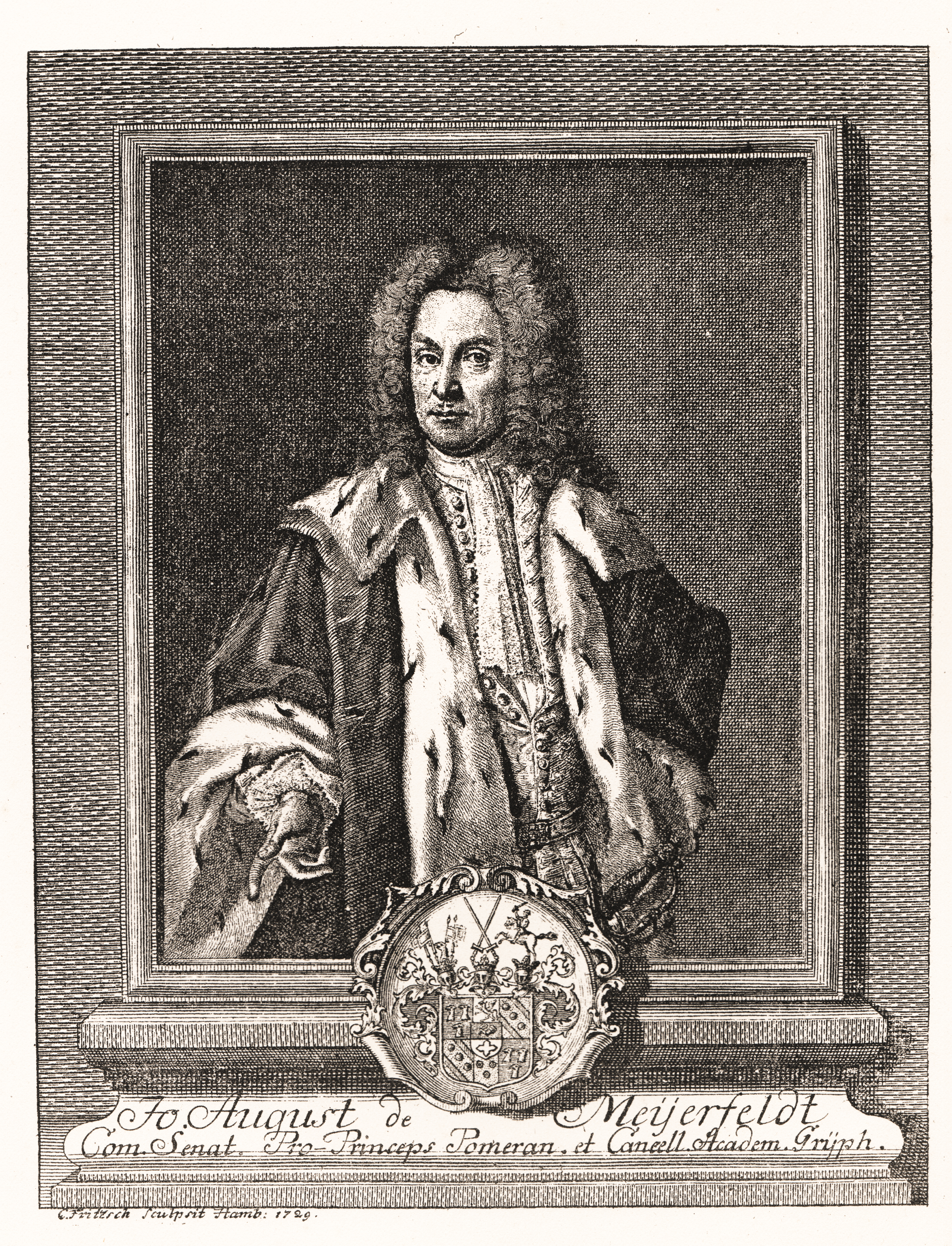
Johan August Meijerfeldt the Elder, engraving by Johann Christian Gottfried Fritzsch

Johan August Meijerfeldt (1664–1749) was a Swedish general and civil servant. To distinguish him from his son who had an identical name, he is generally referred to as Johan August Meijerfeldt the Elder.

== Biography ==
Johan August Meijerfeldt was born into a Baltic-German family in Oberpahlen, Livonia (now Estonia) and entered Swedish military service in 1684. He made a rapid military career and was promoted to major general in 1704. During the Battle of Helsingborg in 1710, he led the right flank of the Swedish troops. Later that year he was promoted to lieutenant general and made commander of the Swedish troops in Stettin. The following year he was assigned to the civilian administration as vice governor of Swedish Pomerania, and two years later promoted to governor of the province and was also appointed member of the Privy Council of Sweden. While in Pomerania he also became the rector of the University of Greifswald in 1715. He had to leave Pomerania briefly after the fall of Stralsund to a Prussian-Saxonian-Danish army that same year but returned after the end of the war. He retired from public offices in 1747.

He has been described as one of the most accomplished generals serving under King Charles XII of Sweden, and as a successful civil servant. He became a Swedish baron in 1705, and in 1714 was raised to the rank of count.
