= Altranstädt =

Village in Saxony, Germany

Coordinates: 51°18′52″N 12°10′35″E

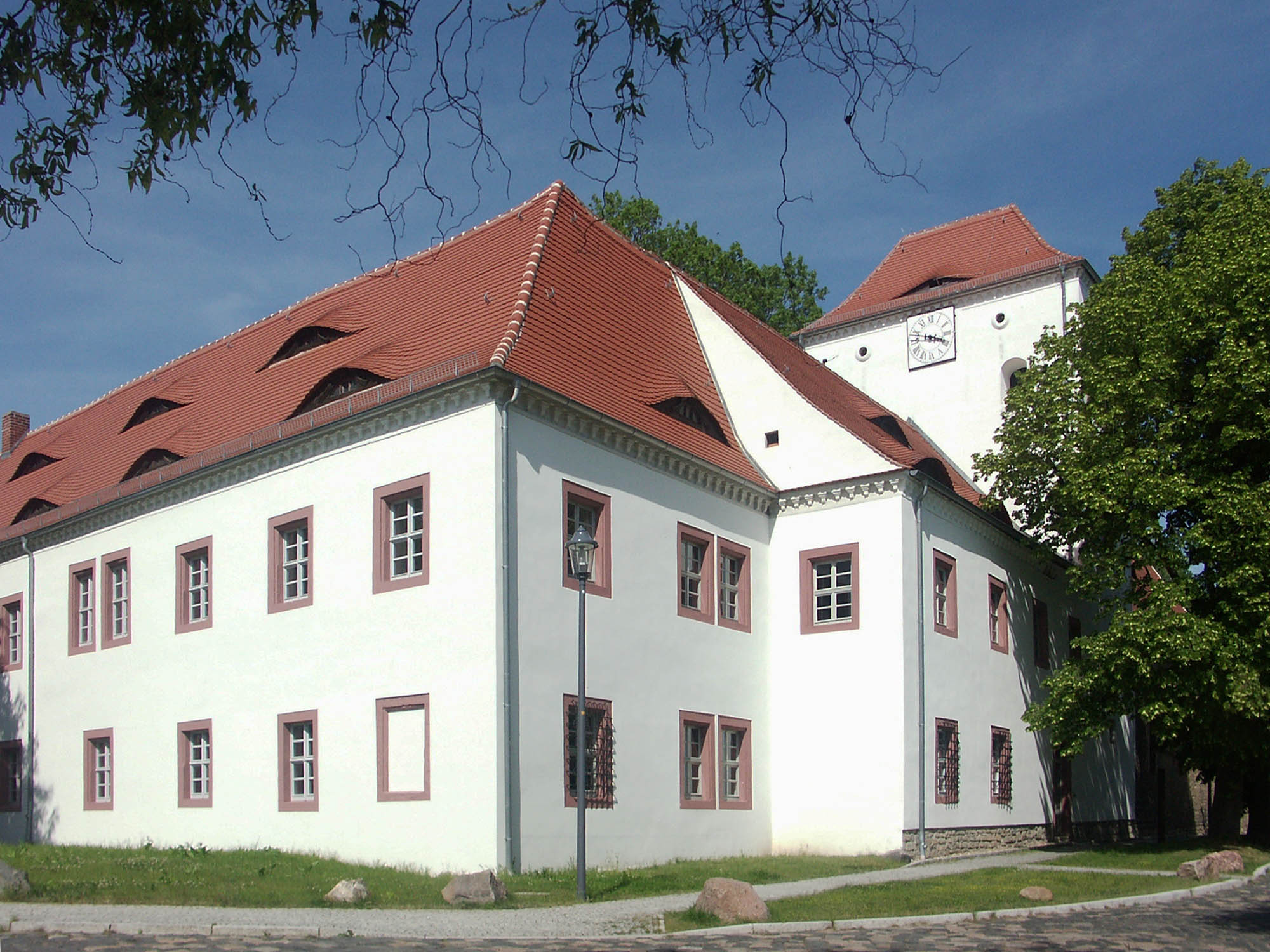
Altranstädt Castle

Altranstädt (German pronunciation: [ˈaltˌʁanʃtɛt]) is a village and former municipality in Saxony, Germany, now part of the town Markranstädt in the district of Leipzig. The village is historically famous for two treaties that were concluded there, the Treaty of Altranstädt (1706) and the Treaty of Altranstädt (1707).

The 1706 treaty was a peace which Augustus II, king of Poland and elector of Saxony, was forced to ratify on 24 September 1706, with Charles XII of Sweden. The former renounced the throne of Poland in favor of Stanislaus Leszczynski's treaty which Augustus declared null and void after Charles XII's defeat at Poltava (8 July 1709). The other treaty was signed on 31 August 1707. Emperor Joseph I guaranteed to Charles XII religious tolerance and liberty of conscience for the Silesian Protestants.

Charles was visited in Altranstädt by John Churchill, 1st Duke of Marlborough on behalf of the Grand Alliance against France. During 1707-08 he persuaded Charles not to support France but to leave Germany, never to return.

== Miscellaneous ==
The fortifications of Leipzig included a "Rannisches Tor" (Ranstädt Gate), outside of which was the "Rannische Vorstadt" (Ranstädt Vorstadt). Running through this area was the "Ranstädter Steinweg" (literally: the stone-paved road toward Ranstädt)—a route that still exists today. Ranstädt is known today as Altranstädt.
