= Treaty of Altranstädt (1707) =

1707 treaty between Sweden and the Holy Roman Empire

Altranstädter Konvention
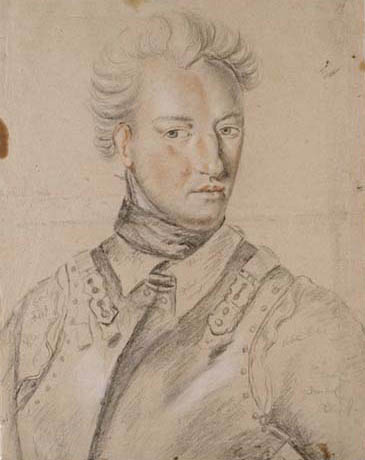
- Charles XII of Sweden in Altranstädt 1706-1707, by Johan David Swartz
- Type: Religious freedoms in Silesia
- Signed: 31 August 1707
- Location: Altranstädt
- Parties: Charles XII of Sweden; Joseph I, Holy Roman Emperor

The Treaty or Convention of Altranstädt was signed between Charles XII of Sweden and Joseph I, Holy Roman Emperor on 31 August 1707. It settled the rights of Protestants in Silesia.

== Historical context ==
While the Protestant Reformation had strongly affected Silesia, the Habsburg emperors had subjected the province to the Counter-Reformation in the 18th century. In Upper Silesia, in particular, these measures were successful: in the early 18th century, almost half of the Silesian population was Roman Catholic and some 1,000 churches had been rededicated from Protestant to Roman Catholic. The Peace of Westphalia (1648) protected Protestants only in the duchies of Brieg, Liegnitz, Münsterberg, Öls, Wohlau and in the city of Breslau. In the duchies of Jauer, Glogau and Schweidnitz, the Protestants were allowed to maintain three "Churches of Peace" (Friedenskirchen) outside the city walls. However, after 1675, only Breslau and the Duchy of Oels were spared from the counter-reformation, despite the protests of Sweden and the Protestant states of the Holy Roman Empire.

During the Great Northern War, Charles XII of Sweden had marched his armies through Silesia and occupied the Electorate of Saxony, where he forced his adversary, elector August the Strong, into the Treaty of Altranstädt (1706).

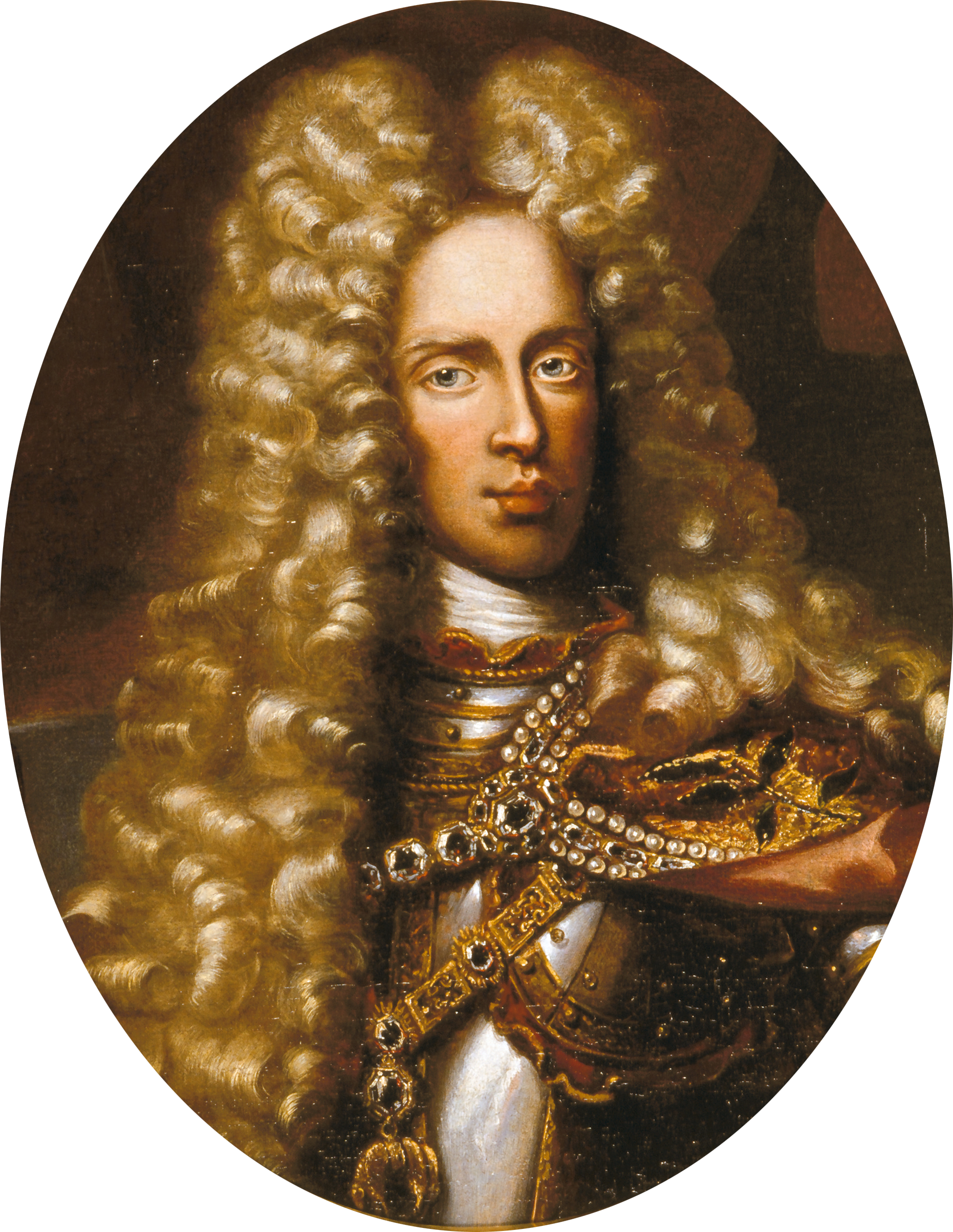
Joseph I, Holy Roman Emperor

== Terms and implementation ==
During his stay in Saxon Altranstädt near Leipzig, Charles XII negotiated a further treaty with the Habsburg emperor. Joseph I agreed to return several churches to the Protestant communities, and to permit the erection of six "mercy churches". The "mercy churches" were erected in Freystadt, Hirschberg, Landeshut, Militsch, Sagan and Teschen, 125 churches were returned. Joseph I dispensed with any further counter-reformatory policies. Three Protestant consistories were permitted, restoring and stabilizing Silesian Lutheranism.

The treaty was negotiated in Altranstädt from April 1707. Joseph I signed this convention in order to prevent Charles XII from entering the War of the Spanish Succession on the French side, and held onto strict Roman Catholic policies in his other hereditary lands. When Silesia became a Prussian province in 1742, the Protestant Prussian king in the Peace of Breslau safeguarded the Roman Catholics' rights and possessions.

== Sources ==
=== Bibliography ===
- Bromley, J. S. (1970). Rise of Great Britain & Russia, 1688-1725. The New Cambridge Modern History. Vol. 6. CUP Archive. ISBN 0-521-07524-6.
- Büsch, Otto; Neugebauer, Wolfgang (1992). Vom Kaiserreich zum 20. Jahrhundert und große Themen der Geschichte Preußens. Handbuch der preussischen Geschichte (in German). Vol. 3. Walter de Gruyter. p. 575. ISBN 3-11-014092-6.
- Herzig, Arno (2000). Der Zwang zum wahren Glauben. Rekatholisierung vom 16. bis zum 18. Jahrhundert (in German). Vandenhoeck & Ruprecht. ISBN 3-525-01384-1.
- Klueting, Harm (1999). Das Reich und Österreich 1648-1740. Historia profana et ecclesiastica. Geschichte und Kirchengeschichte zwischen Mittelalter und Moderne (in German). Vol. 1. Berlin-Hamburg-Münster: LIT Verlag. ISBN 3-8258-4280-0.
- Metzdorf, Jens (2000). Politik, Propaganda, Patronage. Veröffentlichungen des Instituts für Europäische Geschichte Mainz, Abteilung für Universalgeschichte (in German). Vol. 179. Zabern. ISBN 3-8053-2584-3.
- Reifenscheid, Richard (1982). Die Habsburger in Lebensbildern. Von Rudolf I. bis Karl I. (in German) (4 ed.). Styria. ISBN 3-222-11431-5.
