= Frauenwald =

- Ortsteil of Ilmenau
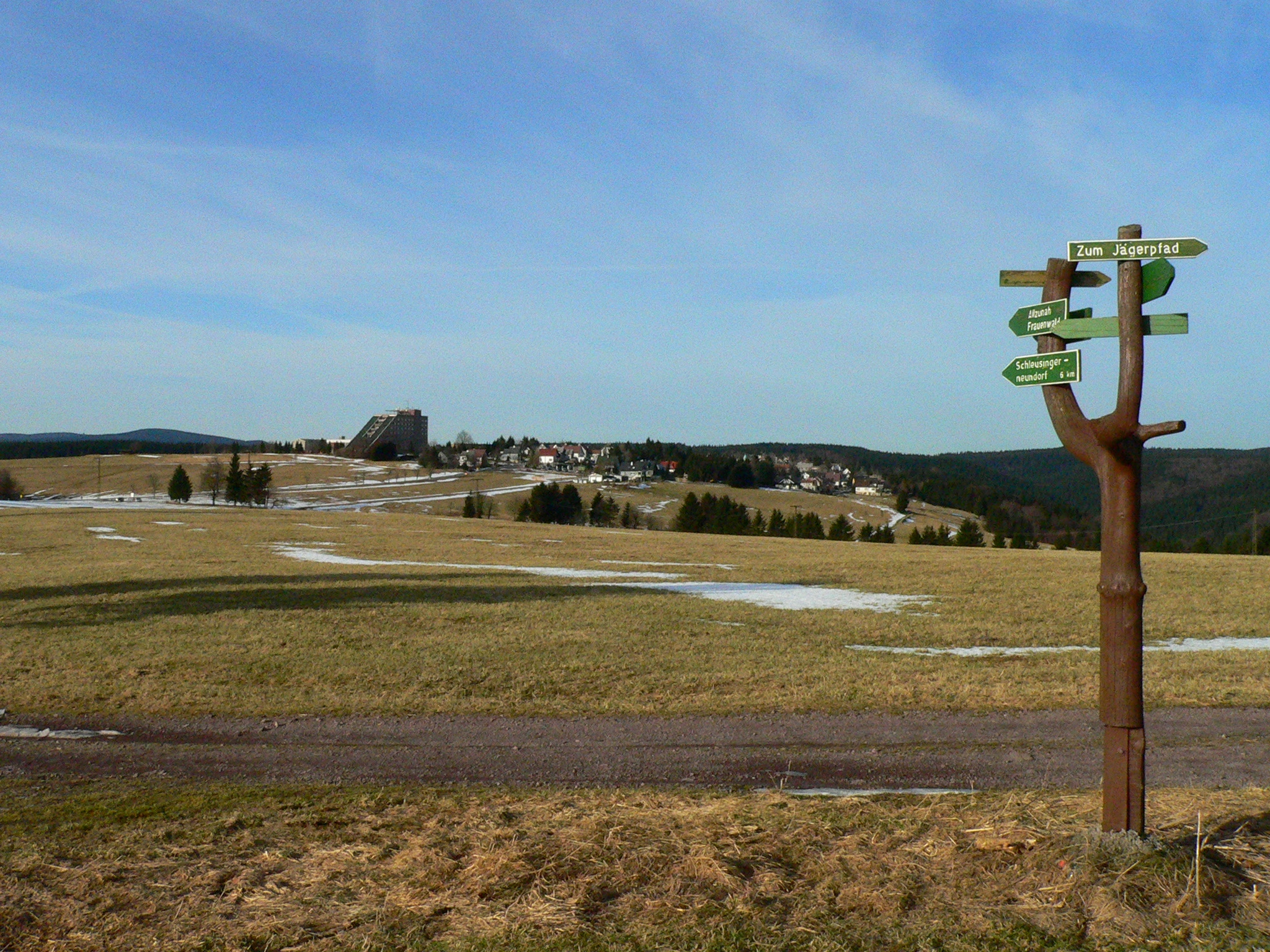
- View towards Frauenwald

- Coat of arms
- Interactive map of Frauenwald
- Location within Germany Location within Thuringia
- Coordinates: 50°34′52″N 10°51′35″E
- Country: Germany
- State: Thuringia
- District: Ilm-Kreis
- Town: Ilmenau

Area
  - Total: 19.14 km^{2} (7.39 sq mi)
- Elevation: 750 m (2,460 ft)

Population (2017-12-31)
  - Total: 992
  - Density: 51.8/km^{2} (134/sq mi)
- Time zone: UTC+01:00 (CET)
  - Summer (DST): UTC+02:00 (CEST)
- Postal codes: 98711
- Dialling codes: 036782
- Vehicle registration: IK

Frauenwald (German pronunciation: [ˈfʁaʊənˌvalt]) is a village and a former municipality in the district Ilm-Kreis, in Thuringia, Germany. Since 1 January 2019, it is part of the town of Ilmenau.
