= Ernst Detlof von Krassow =

Swedish noble and military commander

Ernst Detlof von Krassow, Swedish noble and military commander, (born around 1660, died 23 January 1714), freiherr (1707). Appointed Major General in 1706. Father of Karl Vilhelm von Krassow.

As a colonel, he was an important leader in the cavalry assault in the Battle of Fraustadt in the Great Northern War resulting in the rout of the Saxon cavalry, and the double envelopment of the Saxon main element. During the invasion of Russia in 1708, he commanded the Swedish Army in Poland-Lithuania, consisting of some 8,000 men.
