= Battle of Fraustadt =

Part of the Great Northern War (1706)

Coordinates: 51°48′00″N 16°19′00″E

- Part of the Great Northern War
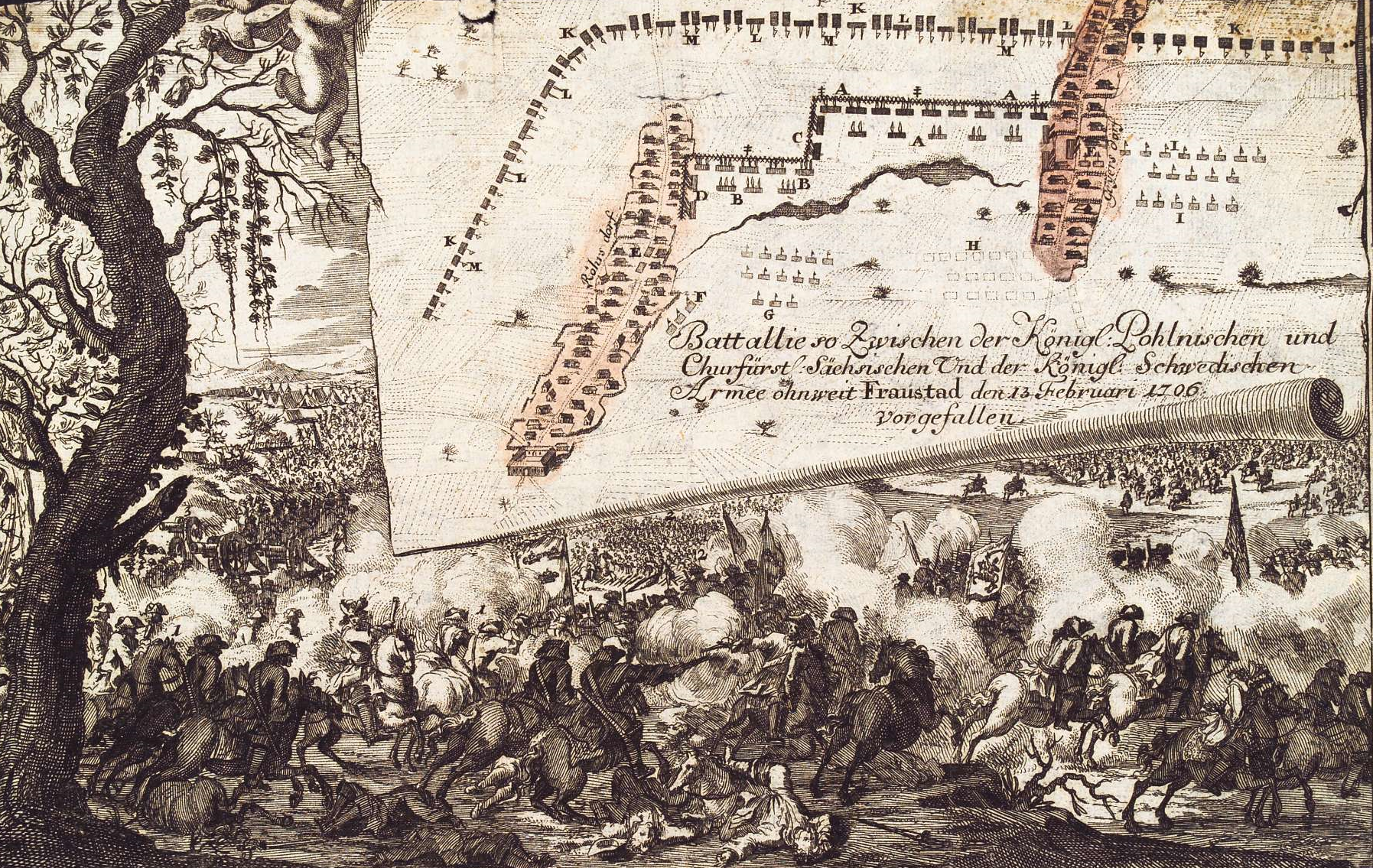
- Battallie bei Fraustad – Johann Christian Marchand
Date	2 February 1706 (O.S.); 3 February 1706 (Swedish calendar); 13 February 1706 (N.S.)
Location	Fraustadt (Wschowa), Poland
Result	Swedish victory

Belligerents
Swedish Empire	Saxony; Tsardom of Russia

Commanders and leaders
(Swedish Empire) Carl Gustaf Rehnskiöld (Swedish Empire) Axel Sparre (Swedish Empire) Alexander Hummerhielm	(Electorate of Saxony) Johann Matthias von der Schulenburg (WIA) (Tsardom of Russia) Gans Vostromirsky (POW)

Strength
9,400	18,000 to 20,000 (Note: 6,523 Russians, including 302 not fighting servant); 32 artillery pieces

Casualties and losses
1,500: 452 killed, 1,077 wounded	15,000: 7,377–7,830 killed 7,300–7,900 captured

The Battle of Fraustadt was fought on 2 February 1706 (O.S.) / 3 February 1706 (Swedish calendar) / 13 February 1706 (N.S.) near Fraustadt, now Wschowa, Poland, during the Great Northern War. A Swedish army under Carl Gustaf Rehnskiöld defeated a larger Saxon–Russian force commanded by Johann Matthias von der Schulenburg, consisting of troops from Saxony, the Polish–Lithuanian Commonwealth, German mercenaries, and the Tsardom of Russia.

Although outnumbered by more than two to one, Rehnskiöld attacked Schulenburg's entrenched position. Swedish cavalry routed the Saxon horse on both flanks and then turned inward against the rear of the enemy infantry, completing a double envelopment. The result was a decisive Swedish victory: the Russian contingent was almost destroyed, while thousands of Saxon and German troops were taken prisoner. Fraustadt became one of Sweden's most notable victories of the war and is often cited as a classic example of a successful pincer movement.

== Background ==
After King Charles XII of Sweden's victory against the Saxon-Russian army in the Battle of Düna, he was able to begin his campaign against Poland. After the victory at the Battle of Kliszów in July 1702, Charles XII negotiated to depose August II from the throne of Poland, but to no avail. The Swedish army then subjected the well-fortified city of Thorn (Torun) on the river Weichsel to a long-term blockade from May to October 1703. The city fell and its entire garrison of 4,800 Saxon soldiers was taken prisoner. The strength of the Swedish army, combined with August's agreement with Tsar Peter I, caused many Polish nobles to defect to the pro-Swedish opposition. In February 1704, August was declared no longer king of Poland, and in July of the same year Stanisław Leszczyński was elected king.

However, August II was not defeated and the Russians had an interest in supporting him. The Russo-Saxon strategic plan was for a Saxon army under Johann Matthias von der Schulenburg to break into Poland to join a larger cavalry force led by August II himself and then with the main Russian force, which was in Livonia, defeat the Swedish main army. In western Poland, however, there was a Swedish army corps under Rehnskiöld, which either had to be bypassed or fought by Schulenburg before the unification could take place.

In early March 1705, the Russian field marshal Boris Sheremetev organized a meeting with the Saxon general Otto Arnold von Paykull to agree on a joint plan of action to defeat Charles XII. The basis of the strategy was a plan drawn up by the nobleman Johann Patkul as early as 1703, which included a combined attack that would neutralize the Swedish army. Von Paykull was impressed by Patkul's plans, and advocated that the plan could be used as a way to lure Charles XII and the main Swedish army out of Greater Poland and move east towards Brest-Litovsk. This was to be achieved by the convergence of the main Russian army under Georg Benedikt von Ogilvy and von Paykull's troops stationed at Brest, forcing Charles XII to meet them in battle. At the same time, the main Saxon army from Saxony would march past Poland and attack Charles XII from the rear. Patkul considered the plan too risky and suggested that the Allies should first crush Lewenhaupt's Courland army, before Ogilvy's troops would face Charles XII. Otherwise, Ogilvy's back would be threatened. A compromise was made between the two strategies, in which it was agreed that Sheremetev would engage Lewenhaupt while Ogilvy marched on the fortified city of Grodno. There, the allies believed that Ogilvy could hold out against Charles XII's troops long enough for the main Saxon army to arrive from Kraków. Meanwhile, von Paykull would attack with his combined Saxon-Polish troops on Warsaw to interrupt Stanisław's coronation.

== Deployment ==
The Saxon army had not chosen its position carefully; Schulenburg had been maneuvered into a position chosen by the Swedes. Rehnskiöld withdrew his forces from Schlawa to Fraustadt. Rehnskiöld later stated in his journals, (in Swedish) “Så resolverade jag att draga mig till Fraustadt tillbaka i den tanken att locka till mig fienden efter mig utur sin fördel, inbillandes honom att jag ville alldeles draga mig av” roughly translated as ”Thus I resolved to withdraw to Fraustadt with the thought to lure the enemy to me away from his advantageous position, deceiving him into thinking I was in full retreat”.

The Saxons, superior in numbers regarding infantry (9,000 Saxons and 6,300 Russians), but with less cavalry (4,000 Saxons) than the Swedes, took a strong defensive position behind lines of chevaux de frise littered by artillery. In two lines, with cavalry on both flanks, between the villages of Geyersdorf and Röhrsdorf and ahead of the town of Fraustadt, entrenched behind frozen lakes and marshes opposing the Saxon-Russian army, Rehnskiöld placed his infantry of 3,700 men in the center in three columns and his cavalry consisting of 5,700 units on both flanks.

== Battle ==
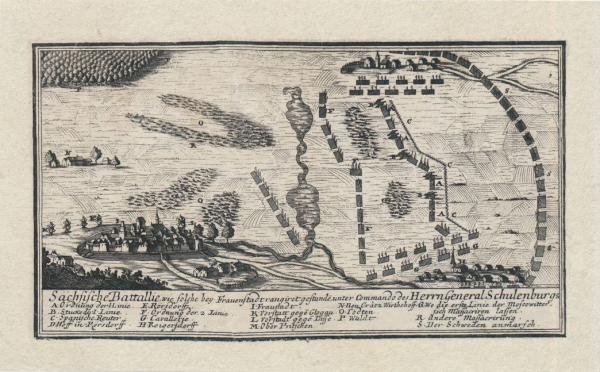
Saxony (Left), Sweden (Right)

On the left flank, the Swedish cavalry under Alexander Hummerhielm had some trouble passing through a frozen swamp, but the Saxon cavalry did not use that advantage. After regrouping, the Swedes charged the Saxon Garde du Corps and Chevaliers Garde regiments three times, utterly routing them. Colonel von Krassow, commander of the Swedish cavalry on the right flank, passed outside the left Russian flank with 12 dragoon squadrons, near the village of Röhrsdorf, and engaged the Saxon Cavalry covering the Russian flank. After witnessing the destruction of the Saxon right flank, the left flank fled, and were routed by the Swedish dragoons. Colonel von Krassow's cavalry then wheeled clock-wise into the Saxon-Russian rear, which caused several of the Saxon regiments to break formation.

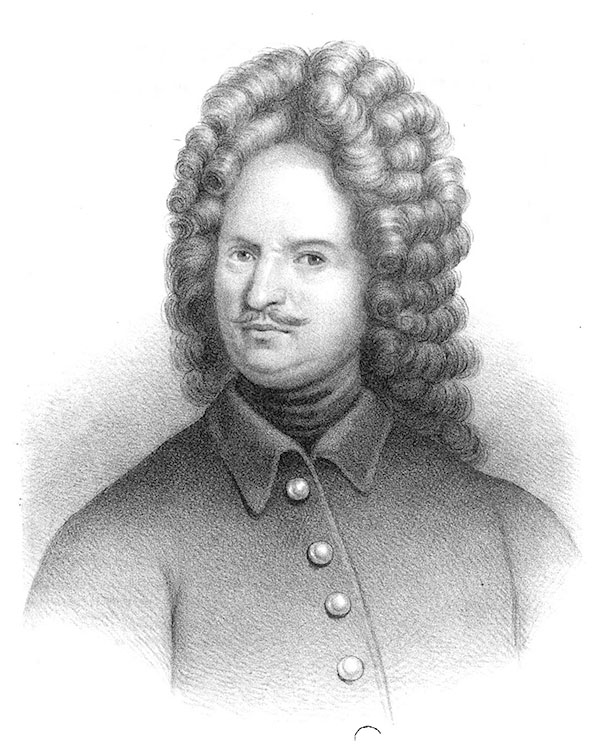
Picture of Alexander Hummerhielm

On the Saxon left flank, facing Rehnskiöld's infantry, the Russians were deployed with their uniforms inside-out so they would look more like Saxons with their red colors instead of the Russian-standard green. This was however an order from Schulenburg who questioned their battle skills to reveal the weakness of the flank. The Swedish infantry assaulted the Saxon-Russian line frontally, under heavy cannon and musket fire. Upon discovering that the left wing of the enemy line was held by the Russian troops, Rehnskiöld directed his infantry to assault their positions, which were also being attacked from the rear by colonel von Krassow's cavalry. The Russian infantry were quickly surrounded and dispersed.

The Saxon middle had its flank and rear exposed, and its regiments buckled and broke formation in short order under the pressure along its left flank. The Saxon right flank initially held, inflicting some damage to the Swedish infantry until the cavalry in the frozen swamp attacked their rear. The Saxon-Russian army fell apart and the main body fled to the south through Fraustadt. The Swedish cavalry, previously bogged down in the swamp, raced ahead on the open terrain, and met the fleeing Saxons and Russians on the far outskirts of the town. Trapped by Swedish cavalry to their front and infantry to their rear, the defeated Saxon-Russian forces surrendered en masse.

=== Casualties and losses ===
In the end 7,377 Saxons and Russians had been killed and over 7,300 taken prisoner where of 2,000 of them were wounded. The Swedes suffered some 400 killed, (amongst them, commander of the Kronoberg Regiment, colonel Gabriel Lilliehöök) and 1,000 wounded. Schulenburg managed to escape, despite having suffered a bullet wound to his hip. 71 banners, the whole Saxon artillery, 11,000 rapiers and equally as many muskets had also been captured. Rehnskiöld executed about 500 Russian prisoners; it is debated whether he did this in retaliation for Russian atrocities in Courland or because he believed their inside-out coats were an attempt to be recognized as Saxons, who were given better terms in captivity. Hiding your own identity and claiming to be something else was frowned upon at the time, and sometimes considered reason enough to be denied quarter.

== Analysis ==
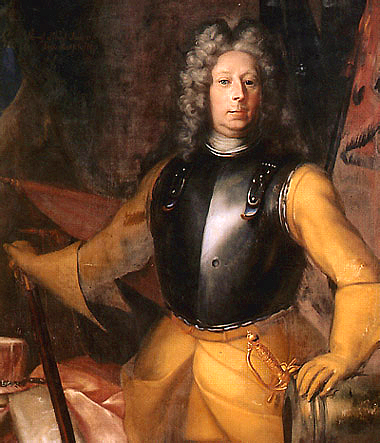
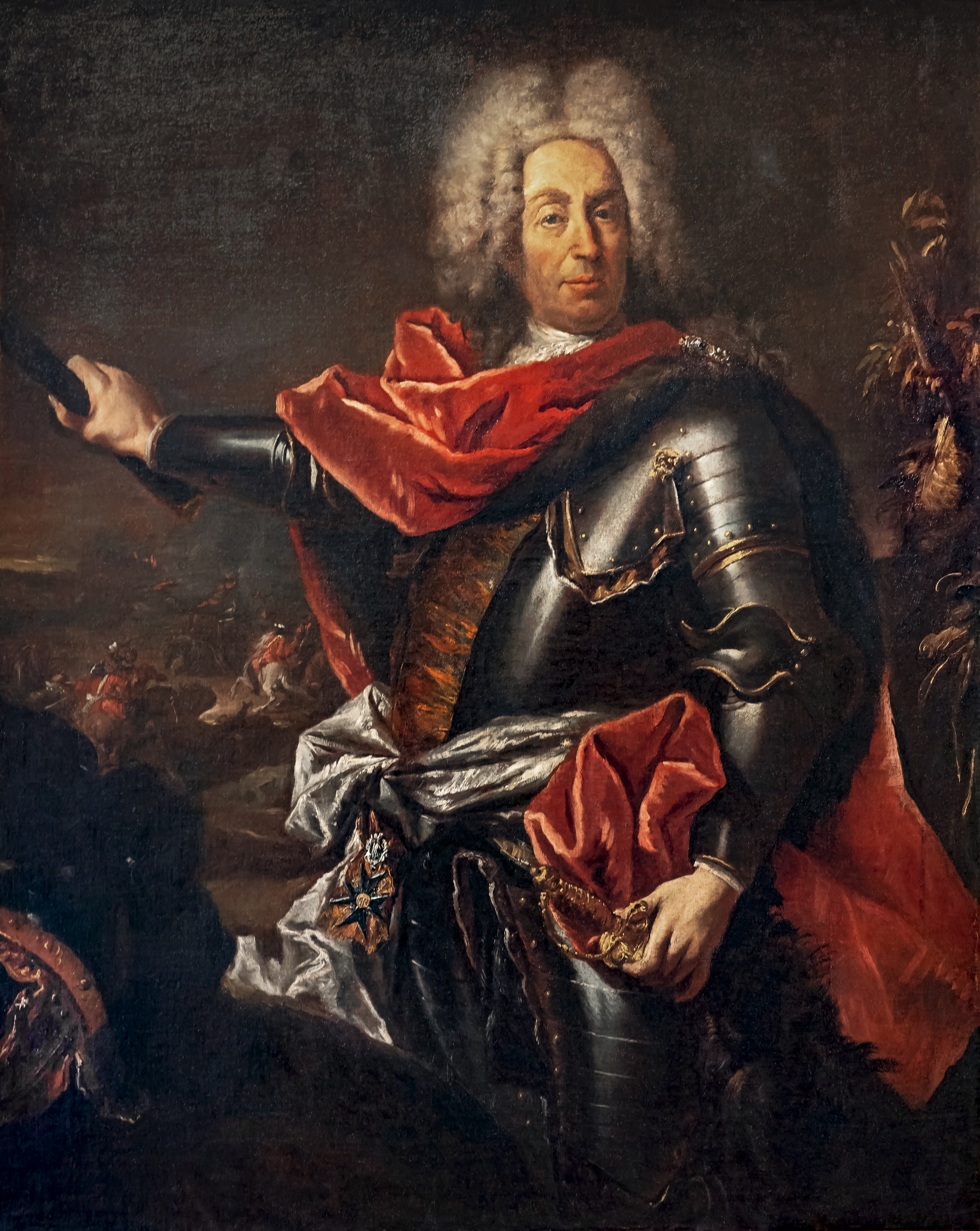
Carl Gustaf Rehnskiöld (top) Matthias Schulenburg (bottom)

The Swedish success in the battle was mainly due to Rehnskiöld effectively neutralising the Saxon infantry, who were superior in number at the start of the battle, combined with the pincer movement performed by the Swedish cavalry under Hummerhielm and von Krassow. Schulenburg also made two grave mistakes: first by being lured into terrain not to his advantage and then underestimating the mobility of the Swedish cavalry, especially on the flanks. It is known from Rehnskiöld's personal journals that he had intended a double envelopment from the beginning. The Battle of Fraustadt is one of the most classic double envelopments in military history. It is probable that Rehnskiöld had studied the Battle of Cannae 216 BC although it is uncertain if he intended to copy it.

== Aftermath ==
The captured Russians (some 500) were, according to some historians, executed by an order from Rehnskiöld, although involvement of the latter has been disputed. The authors further quotes Lieutenant Colonel Nils Gyllenstierna of the Norra Skånska cavalry regiment about the fate of the Russian infantry, (in Swedish) “på några 100 när massakrerat, emedan vi inte i begynnelsen kunde giva kvarter, eftersom vår vänstra flygel ännu stod i full eld” roughly translated as “all but a few hundred were massacred, as initially quarters could not be given, since our left flank was still in full assault”.

From Alexander Magnus Dahlberg's (Dragoon at Buchwalds dragoonregiment) diary:

"Ett ännu som mig underligit förekom vil jag här anföra, nemligen at ingen af de 6000:de ryssar som voro saxerne tilhielp gafs någon pardon, utan blefvo alla masacrerade; de voro alla munderade i hvita råckar med rödt foder, hvaraf några under flyckten som fådt så lång tid, vändt om råckarna och det röda fodret ut, fingo pardon i mening at de voro saxar, men sedan general Renschiöld fick veta at de voro ryssar, lät han föra dem för fronten, och befalte at skiuta dem för hufvudet, som var rätt ett ymkeligt spectacel."

Roughly translated to:

"Something which I found strange I’d like to here mention, is that none of the 6,000 Russians who were the Saxons help were given any mercy, but were instead all massacred; They were all dressed in white coats with red lining, with some during the retreat having turned their coats inside out to resemble Saxons in hope of mercy, but after General Renschiöld learned they were Russians, he had them taken to the front to be shot in the head, which was quite a wretched spectacle."

The road to Saxony was open for King Charles XII of Sweden. King August II of Poland gave up his claim on the Polish crown, although he remained Elector Frederick Augustus I of Saxony. He would later regain the Polish throne in 1709. The prisoners taken by the Swedes during the battle that were of German, French and Swiss nationality were immediately reorganized into the ranks of the Swedish army. The Saxon prisoners were shipped to Sweden, where they formed a regiment and three battalions. This regiment made a good effort at the Battle of Helsingborg in 1710.

== See also ==
- Campaign of Grodno
- Swedish invasion of Poland (1701–1706)

== Sources ==
- Velikanov, Vladimir S. (2018). Русский вспомогательный корпус на Польско-Саксонской службе в 1704-1707 и сражение при Фрауштадте [The Russian Auxiliary Corps in Polish-Saxon service in 1704-1707 and the Battle of Fraustadt] (in Russian). Russian Academy of Sciences: Ratnoe delo. Moscow: Русские витязи. ISBN 978-5-6040158-5-8.
