= Treaty of Copenhagen =

Treaty of Copenhagen may refer to:

- Treaty of Copenhagen (1441), a peace treaty ending the Dutch–Hanseatic War
- Treaty of Copenhagen (1468), by which Margaret of Denmark, was betrothed to James III of Scotland
- Treaty of Copenhagen (1660), a peace treaty in the Second Northern War
- Treaty of Copenhagen (1670), a treaty of commerce and alliance between Denmark-Norway and Great Britain
- Treaty of Copenhagen (1709), an alliance in the Great Northern War
- Copenhagen Convention of 1857 governing transit passage through the Danish Straits, whereby a group of shipping nations bought out the Sound Dues in the Øresund
- Copenhagen Accord, a document adopted at United Nations Climate Change Conference 2009

== See also ==
- Copenhagen Convention (disambiguation)
