= Copenhagen Convention =

Copenhagen Convention can mean:

- Copenhagen Convention of 1857 governing transit passage through the Danish Straits, whereby a group of shipping nations bought out the Sound Dues in the Øresund
- A bidding convention used in bridge; see Copenhagen convention (bridge)
- Copenhagen Accord, a document adopted at United Nations Climate Change Conference 2009

== See also ==
- Treaty of Copenhagen (disambiguation)
- Treaty of Copenhagen (1660)
- Treaty of Copenhagen (1441)
