= Battle of the Desna =

Engagement of the Great Northern War

- Part of the Swedish invasion of Russia
Date	11–13 November 1708
Location	Desna River, Left-Bank Hetmanate
Result	Swedish victory

Belligerents
Swedish Empire	Tsardom of Russia

Commanders and leaders
(Swedish Empire) Charles XII (Swedish Empire) Berndt Otto Stackelberg	Aleksandr Gordon; Ludwig Nicolaus Hallart

Strength
2,000; 12 cannons	4,000; 8 cannons

Casualties and losses
50 killed 150 wounded	356–800 killed 900–1,000 wounded

The Battle of the Desna, also known as the Crossing of the Desna River, was a three-day operation which took place on 11 to 13 November 1708 during the Swedish invasion of Russia of the Great Northern War. The Swedes under Charles XII tried to prevent the Russians from seizing the town of Baturyn, by crossing the river of Desna near Mezyn (present-day Novhorod-Siverskyi Raion, Ukraine) which was strongly defended by the Russian Army of 4,000 men under Ludwig Nicolaus von Hallart. On 11 November the Swedes attempted to build a bridge going over the river, however, the heavy fire from the Russians made for slow progress and so, on 12 November, Berndt Otto Stackelberg with 600 men crossed the river on rafts to cover the ongoing construction of the bridge. The Russians counterattacked but were fiercely repulsed by the outnumbered Swedish defenders. The Russians retreated on 13 November leaving about 356–800 men dead while having another 900–1,000 wounded. The crossing had been successful and was often compared to Alexander the Great's crossing of the Granicus. However, the Swedes were too late to defend Baturyn and the city had already been destroyed in the Sack of Baturyn.
