= Dutch–Hanseatic War =

Conflict

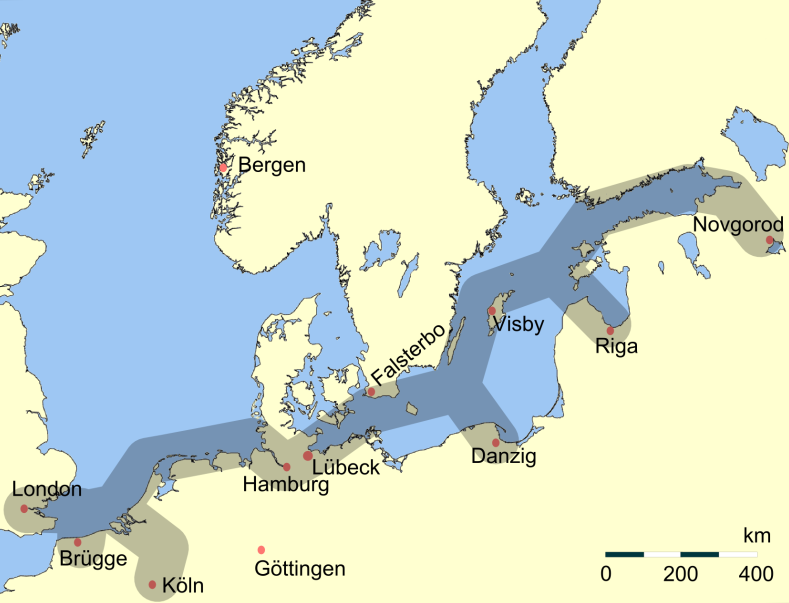
- The main trading routes of the Hanseatic League
Date	1438–1441
Location	North Sea, Øresund
Result	Treaty of Copenhagen:

Belligerents
Burgundy: County of Holland; Norway	Hanseatic League; Denmark; Lüneburg; Mecklenburg; Pomerania; Holstein; Brandenburg

Commanders and leaders
Philip the Good; Hendrik van Borssele; Eric of Pomerania	Johann Lüneburg; Christopher of Bavaria
- a: Eric of Pomerania was deposed as king of Denmark and Sweden in 1439, but retained the Norwegian throne until 1442, when Christopher of Bavaria succeeded in restoring the Kalmar Union of the three Scandinavian countries. b: Christopher of Bavaria was proclaimed King of Denmark, as Christopher III, on 9 April 1440. He was later elected king of Sweden in 1441, and Norway in June 1442.

The Dutch–Hanseatic War was a conflict between the County of Holland, acting independently of the rest of the Burgundian Netherlands of which it formed part, and the Hanseatic League. It led to little actual fighting, with a Dutch fleet patrolling Øresund while a Hanseatic fleet blocked their access to the Baltic Sea. It ended after Eric of Pomerania was forced from the throne of Denmark in 1440, and the new king Christopher of Bavaria sought a resolution. Peace was concluded in 1441 with the Treaty of Copenhagen.

== Background ==
The Dutch–Hanseatic War was a war of trade competition and control of Baltic shipping. For several years, tensions between Dutch and Hanseatic traders had risen as the Hanseatic traders struggled to keep Dutch trade with Livonia limited. In response, the Dutch had begun employing privateers against German shipping.

== Events and resolution ==
On 14 April 1438 a formal war was declared by the Dutch administration against the six Wendish cities of the League—Hamburg, Lübeck, Lüneburg, Greifswald, Stettin (now Szczecin) and Anklam—and the County of Holstein, and on 23 April the Hanseatic League informed its member cities of the situation and advised shipping via Flanders, rather than Holland or Zeeland. Little actual fighting took place throughout the war, though in May 1438 the Dutch mobilised all suitable ships in Holland and ordered the construction of 79 new vessels. During much of 1438–1440, the Dutch fleet patrolled Øresund but didn't manage to penetrate deeply into the Baltic Sea itself, as the Wendish fleet managed to block the passage. The State of the Teutonic Order however declared itself neutral, and the cities in Prussia refused any military assistance to support the Hanseatic war effort.

When Eric of Pomerania was forced from the throne of Denmark in 1440, an opening for a settlement with the new king Christopher of Bavaria presented itself. Though nominally allied with the Hanseatic cities, he favoured reconciliation and a solution to the conflict, and even awarded Dutch traders the same rights as Hanseatic traders in Denmark. In September 1441 a peace settlement was made through the Treaty of Copenhagen. The settlement meant that the two parties granted each other free trading rights, which gave the Dutch unrestricted access to trade on the Baltic again. This was to be of long-term benefit for the Dutch rather than the German cities, but the peace settlement also contained costly reparations which the Dutch had to pay.
