= Øresund =

Strait between Denmark and Sweden

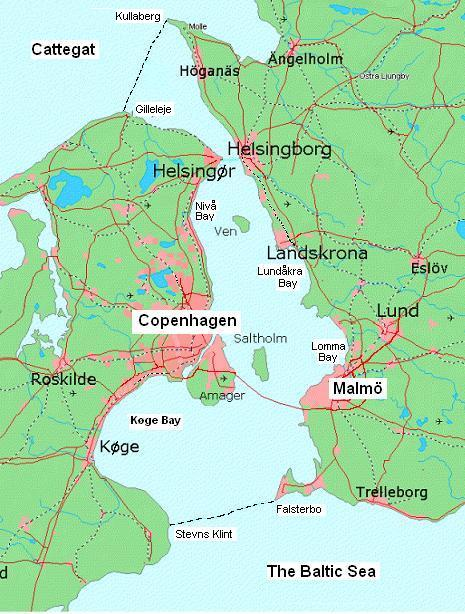
- Øresund, showing its northern and southern boundaries

- Location within Denmark Location within Europe
- Coordinates: 55°45′N 12°45′E
- Type: Strait
- Basin countries: Sweden and Denmark
- Max. length: 118 km (73 mi)
- Max. width: 28 kilometres (17 mi)
- Min. width: 4 km (2.5 mi)
- Max. depth: −40 m (−130 ft)

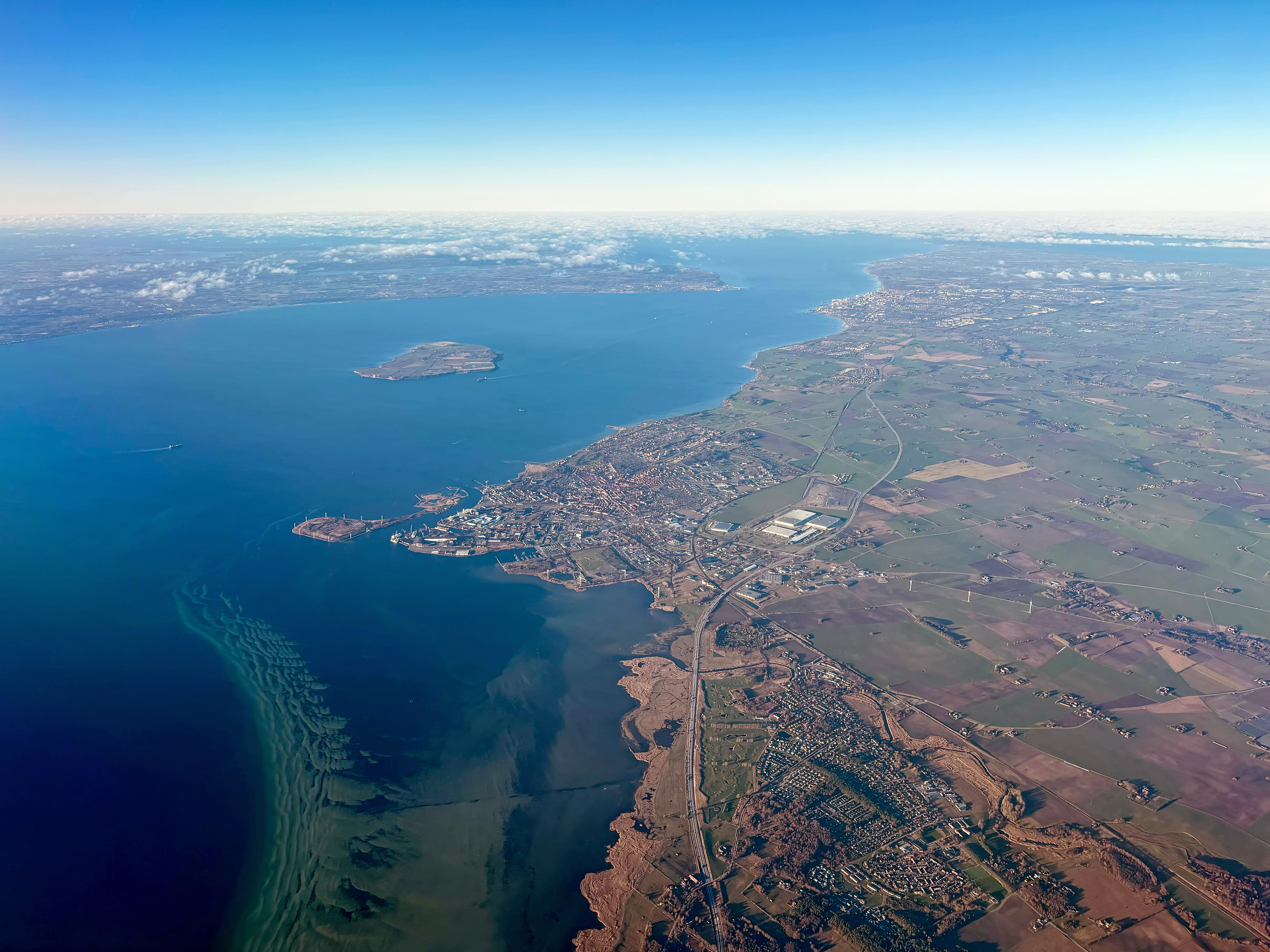
Aerial view of Øresund and the municipality of Landskrona in Sweden

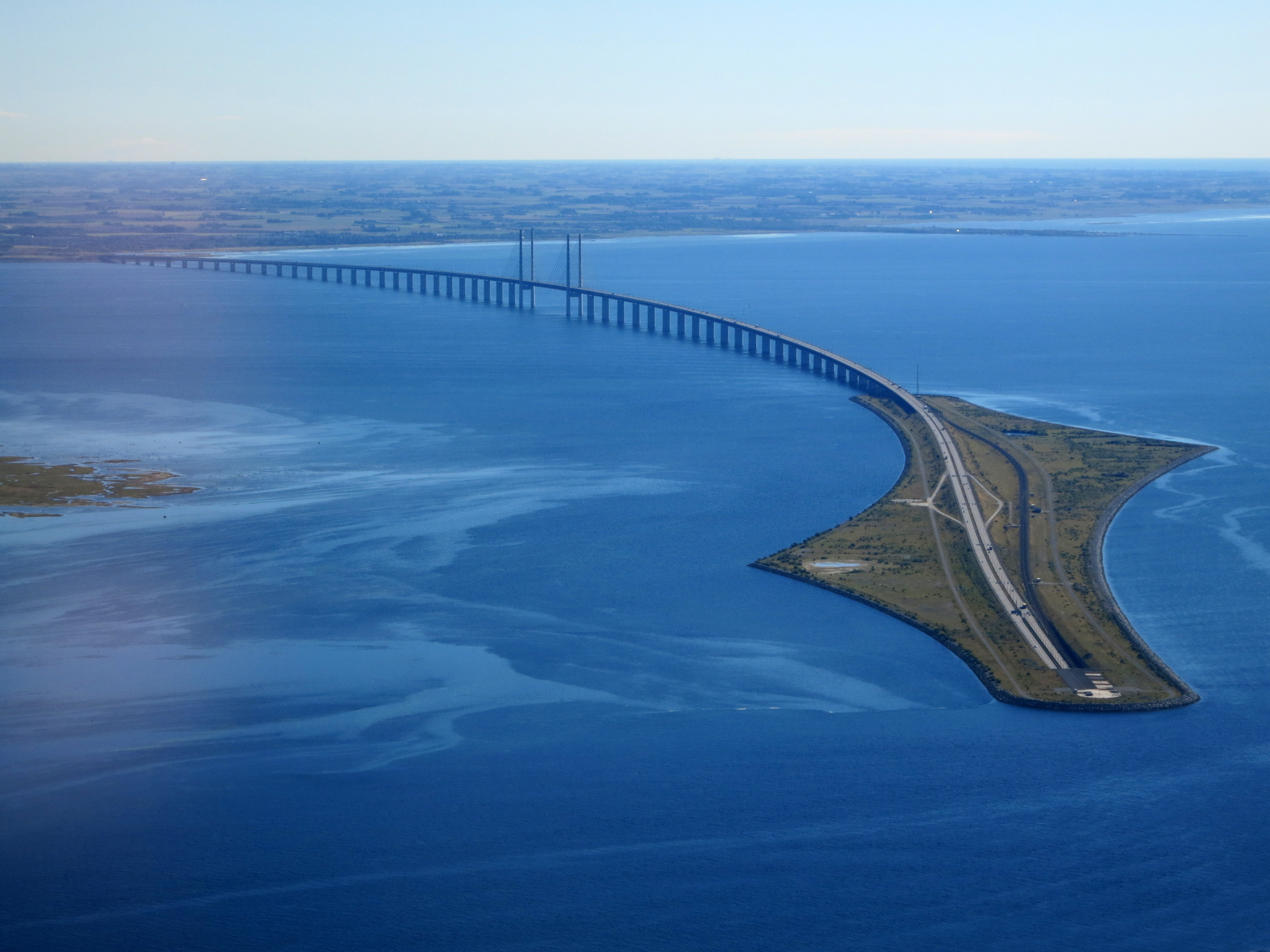
Øresund Bridge from the air in September 2015

Øresund or Öresund (UK: /ˌɜːrəˈsʊnd/, US: /ˈɜːrəsʌn, -sʊnd, ˈɔːrəsʊnd/), commonly known in English as the Sound, is a strait which forms the Danish–Swedish border, separating Zealand (Denmark) from Scania (Sweden). The strait has a length of 118 kilometres (73 mi); its width varies from 4 kilometres (2.5 mi) to 28 kilometres (17 mi). The narrowest point is between Helsingør in Denmark and Helsingborg in Sweden.

Øresund, along with the Great Belt, the Little Belt and the Kiel Canal, is one of four waterways that connect the Baltic Sea to the Atlantic Ocean via Kattegat, Skagerrak, and the North Sea; this makes it one of the busiest waterways in the world.

The Øresund Bridge, between the Danish capital Copenhagen and the Swedish city of Malmö, inaugurated on 1 July 2000, connects a bi-national metropolitan area with close to 4 million inhabitants. The HH Ferry route, between Helsingør, Denmark and Helsingborg, Sweden, in the northern part of Øresund, is one of the world's busiest international ferry routes, with more than 70 departures from each harbour per day.

Øresund is a geologically young strait that formed 8,500–8,000 years ago as a result of rising sea levels. Previously, the Ancylus Lake, a fresh-water body occupying the Baltic basin, had been connected to the sea solely via the Great Belt. The incursion of salt water via Øresund marked the beginning of the modern Baltic Sea as a salt-water body.

== Name ==
The strait is called Øresund in Danish (and Norwegian), and Öresund in Swedish, informally Sundet (lit. 'the Strait') in all three languages. The first part of the name is øre 'gravel/sand beach', and the second part is sund, i.e. 'sound, strait'.

The name is first attested on a runestone dated to c. AD 1000, where it is written as ura suti, read as Old East Norse /øːrasundi/ (in the dative case). The Old West Norse (and modern Icelandic) form of the name is Eyrarsund. Ør is the modern form of the old Norse word aur meaning a gravel beach or shoal (see also ayre), often forming a spit. Such landforms are common in the area and ør or ör is found in the names of many places along the strait, such as Helsingør, Skanör, Dragør and Halör, an important center of trade during the Viking Age.

== Boundaries ==
The northern boundary between Øresund and Kattegat is a line which goes from Gilleleje at Zealand's northern peak to the westernmost point of Kullaberg (Kullen's Lighthouse) at the smaller peninsula north of Helsingborg, known as Kullahalvön. In the south, the boundary towards the Baltic Sea starts at Stevns Klint, at the westernmost peak of the peninsula just south of Køge Bay, Stevns Peninsula to Falsterbo at the Falsterbo peninsula. Its eastern boundary is the Swedish coastline; to the west Amager may be considered part of Øresund (in which case it is the largest island) or a part of Zealand. Amager has eight connections with Zealand (two street bridges, a road bridge, a motorway bridge, a dual-track railway tunnel, an underground metro and a bicycle bridge) as well as a combined motorway and dual track railway to Scania and Sweden.

== Streams, animals and salinity ==
Øresund, like other Danish and Danish-German straits, is at the border between oceanic salt water (which has a salinity of more than 30 PSU or per mille by weight) and the far less salty Baltic Sea.

As the Kattegat in the north has almost oceanic conditions and the Baltic Sea (around 7 PSU, in its main basin) has brackish water, Øresund's water conditions are rather unusual and shifting. The streams are very complex, but the surface stream is often northbound (from the Baltic Sea) which gives a lower surface salinity, though streams can change from one day to another. The average surface salinity is about 10–12 PSU in the southern part, but above 20 PSU north of Helsingør.

Near the seafloor (where the sea is deep enough), conditions are more stable and salinity is always oceanic (above 30 PSU) below a certain depth that varies between 10 and 15 metres. In the southern part, however, the depth is 5–6 metres (outside the rather narrow waterways Drogden and Flintrännan), and this is the definite border of oceanic salt water, therefore also a border for many maritime species of animals. Only 52 known salt-water species reside in the central Baltic Sea, compared to around 1500 in the North Sea. Close to 600 species are known to exist in at least some part of Øresund. Well-known examples, for which the bottom salinity makes a distinct breeding border, include lobster, small crabs (Carcinus maenas), several species of flatfish and the lion's mane jellyfish; the latter can sometimes drift into the southwest Baltic Sea, but it cannot reproduce there.

There are daily tides, but the lunar attraction cannot force much water to move from west to east, or vice versa, in narrow waters where the current is either northbound or southbound. So, not much of the difference in water levels in Øresund is due to daily tides, and other circumstances "hide" the little tide that still remains. The current has a much stronger effect than the tide on the water level, but strong winds may also affect the water level. During exceptional conditions, such as storms and hurricanes, oceanic water may suddenly flow into the Baltic Sea at all depths. Such events give deep waters in the southern Baltic Sea higher salinity, which makes it possible for cod to breed there. If no such inflow of oceanic water to the Baltic Sea occurs for around a decade, the breeding of cod becomes endangered.

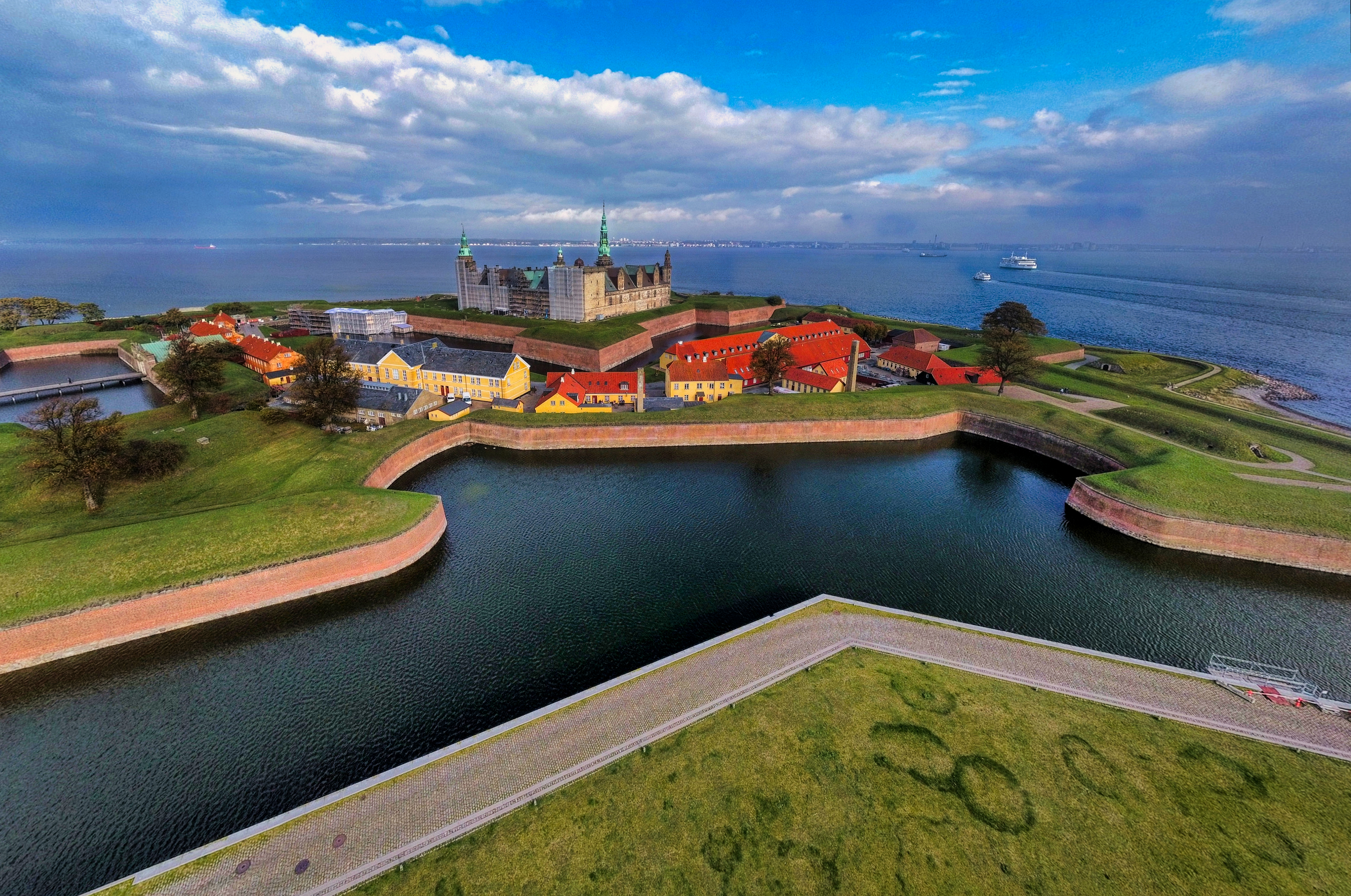
Kronborg castle is situated on the extreme northeastern tip of the island of Zealand at the narrowest point of the Øresund

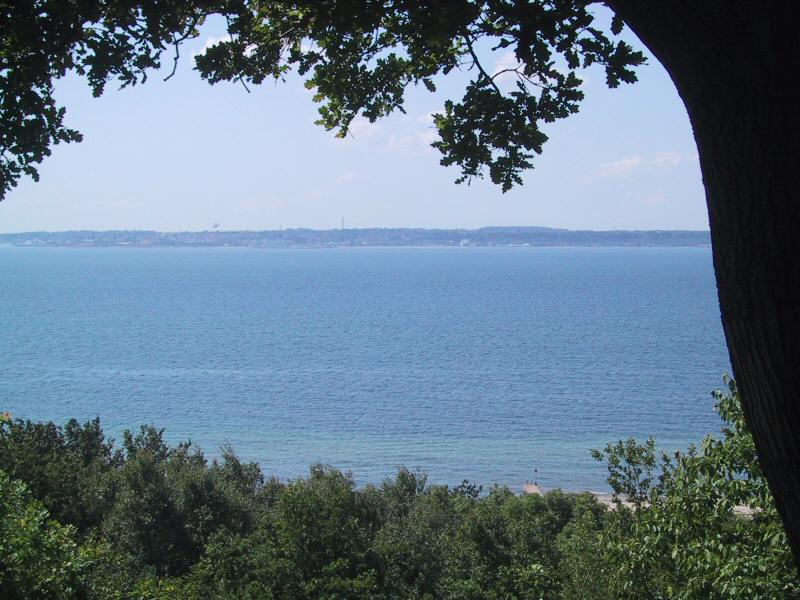
Northern Øresund

== History ==
Political control of Øresund has been an important issue in Danish and Swedish history. Denmark maintained military control with the coastal fortress of Kronborg at Elsinore on the west side and Kärnan at Helsingborg on the east, until the eastern shore was ceded to Sweden in 1658, based on the Treaty of Roskilde. Both fortresses are located where the strait is 4 kilometres wide.

In 1429, King Eric of Pomerania introduced the Sound Dues which remained in effect for more than four centuries, until 1857. Transitory dues on the use of waterways, roads, bridges and crossings were then an accepted way of taxing which could constitute a great part of a state's income. The Sound Dues remained the most important source of income for the Danish Crown for several centuries, thus making Danish kings relatively independent of Denmark's privy council and aristocracy.

To be independent of the Øresund tolls, Sweden carried out two great projects: the foundation of Gothenburg in 1621 and the construction of the Göta Canal from 1810 to 1832.

The Copenhagen Convention of 1857 abolished the Dues and made the Danish straits an international waterway.

A fixed connection was opened across the strait in 2000, the Øresund Bridge.

== Notable islands ==
=== Denmark ===
- Amager (western part is artificial enlargement from Øresund, or from Kalvebodene more precisely)
- Saltholm
- Peberholm – an artificial island
- Middelgrundsfortet – an artificial island
- Flakfortet – an artificial island
- Amager Strandpark - an artificial beach area for Copenhagen
- Brøndby Strandpark - an artificial beach area for Copenhagen in Køge Bugt
- Vallensbæk-Ishøj Strandpark - an artificial beach area for Copenhagen in Køge Bugt

=== Sweden ===
- Ven (Hven in older Swedish and Danish)
- Gråen – an artificial island outside port of Landskrona (enlargements from Øresund in the 17th and 20th centuries)

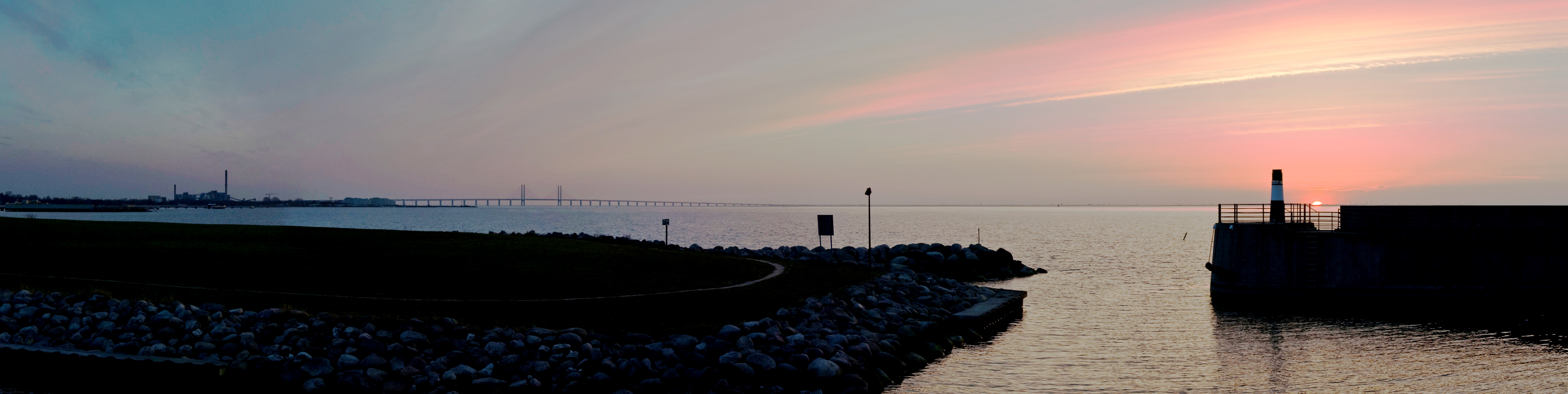
Øresund Strait from Malmö

== Notable sights ==
=== Denmark ===
- Køge Bugt (Køge Bay)
- Nivå Bugt (Nivå Bay)
- Kalveboderne

=== Sweden ===
- Lundåkrabukten (Lundåkra Bay)
- Lommabukten (Lomma Bay)
- Höllviken

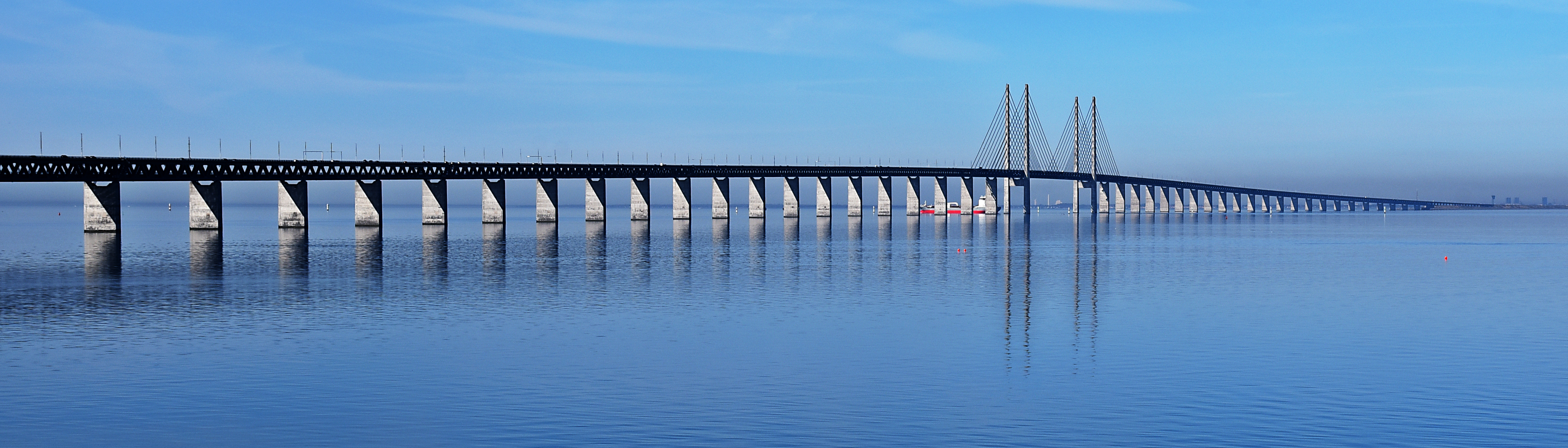
Øresund Bridge, Øresund

== See also ==
- Great Belt
- Little Belt
- Kiel Canal
- Øresund Region
- Øresund Bridge
- Øresund station on the Copenhagen Metro
- Øresundsmetro - a proposed bi-national metro system serving Copenhagen and Malmö
