= Berndt Otto Stackelberg =

Swedish field marshal (1662–1734)

Friherre Berndt Otto Stackelberg
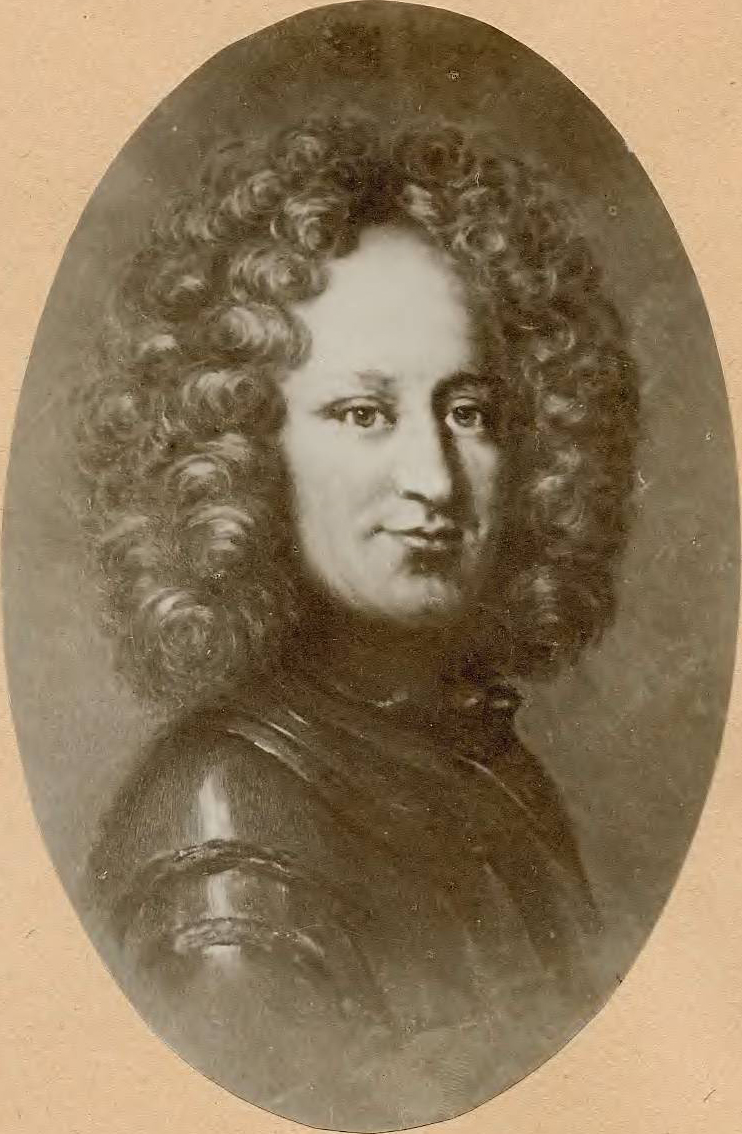
- Born: 14 May 1662; Reval, Livonia
- Died: 29 August 1734 (aged 72) Åbo, Finland
- Allegiance: Sweden; Dutch Republic; France
- Service years: 1685–1734
- Rank: Field marshal (Fältmarskalk)
- Commands: Björneborg County infantry Regiment; Åbo County Infantry Regiment
- Conflicts: Nine Years' War; Great Northern War; Battle of Rauge; Battle of Jakobstadt; Battle of Gemauerthof; Battle of Lesnaya; Battle of Desna; Siege of Veprik; Battle of Poltava (POW)
- Spouse: Margareta Elisabeth Maidel (m. 1696)

Friherre Berndt Otto von Stackelberg (Note: In Swedish sources his name is written without von) (14 May 1662 – 29 August 1734), also known as Berndt Otto Stackelberg the Elder, was a Swedish field marshal (fältmarskalk) and nobleman. Stackelberg fought in the Great Northern War as a subordinate to Adam Ludwig Lewenhaupt and King Charles XII, seeing action in a number of major battles until his capture at the battle of Poltava. After the war, and his subsequent release, he would be given overall command of Swedish forces in Finland.

== Biography ==
Berndt Otto Stackelberg was born on 14 May 1662 in the Livonian city of Reval to colonel Wolter von Stackelberg and Helene Lieven. In addition to being a soldier, his father was also governor-general of Ösel and hereditary lord of Hallinap. Stackelberg began his military career in 1685 and later participated in the Nine Years' War on both sides, first in service with the Dutch from 1688 to 1690 and then with the French until 1696. By the end of his service he had attained the rank of Captain.

At the start of the Great Northern War in 1700, he was made an adjutant general and served under Otto Vellingk. The following year, he was then placed under the command of Wolmar Anton von Schlippenbach and would see action at the battle of Rauge, where he commanded the artillery. In 1702, Stackelberg was promoted to colonel and given command of the Björneborg County infantry Regiment. In February 1703, Stackelberg defeated a contingent of Poles under Grzegorz Antoni Oginski in an engagement near Janitzsky.

In 1704, Stackelberg was transferred to the army of Adam Ludwig Lewenhaupt and was present at the battle of Jakobstadt and the capture of Biržai Castle. The Following year, he fought at Gemauerthof, commanding the Swedish vanguard, and was promoted to major-general in 1706. Stackelberg garnered a reputation for being bold and courageous in battle, but was also considered to be reckless in certain situations. This would cause conflict between him and Lewenhaupt, who accused him of jeopardising the army's chances of victory at Jakobstadt and Gemauerthof.

In 1708, after Charles XII began his campaign in Russia, Lewenhaupt was tasked with carrying supplies for the King's army. Whilst en route, however, they were intercepted by a large Russian army near the village of Lesnaya. Stackelberg, with a few battalions, managed to hold off the Russians in a nearby forest. However, the Russians were eventually able to launch an attack against the Swedish flanks, forcing Stackelberg and his men to and abandon the forest, leaving it to be occupied by the Russians. The Swedes attempted to retake the forest but were unsuccessful. Lewenhaupt was forced to retreat, which resulted in the loss of the supplies for Charles' army.

After meeting up with Charles’ army, Stackelberg then came under the direct command of the king himself and would lead a Swedish detachment across the river Desna as well as repulse a subsequent Russian counterattack. He was then involved in sieging down the town of Veprik, where, during an assault on the town's defences, he was wounded by shrapnel. At the battle of Poltava on 8 July 1709, Stackelberg commanded one of the four infantry columns under Lewenhaupt and took part in the assault on the Russian redoubts in the opening phase of the battle. Stackelberg was taken prisoner along with many other generals after the battle and was forced to take part in Tsar Peter the Great's victory parade in Moscow. From there he was taken to Siberia where he remained in captivity until the end of the war.

After returning to Sweden, Stackelberg was promoted to general and given command of the Åbo County Infantry Regiment. Additionally, he was also made commander-in-chief of the Swedish forces in Finland and was responsible for strengthening the defences in the region. On 11 July 1727, Stackelberg was raised to the rank of field marshal and given the title of Friherre (Baron). He died in Åbo on 29 August 1734.

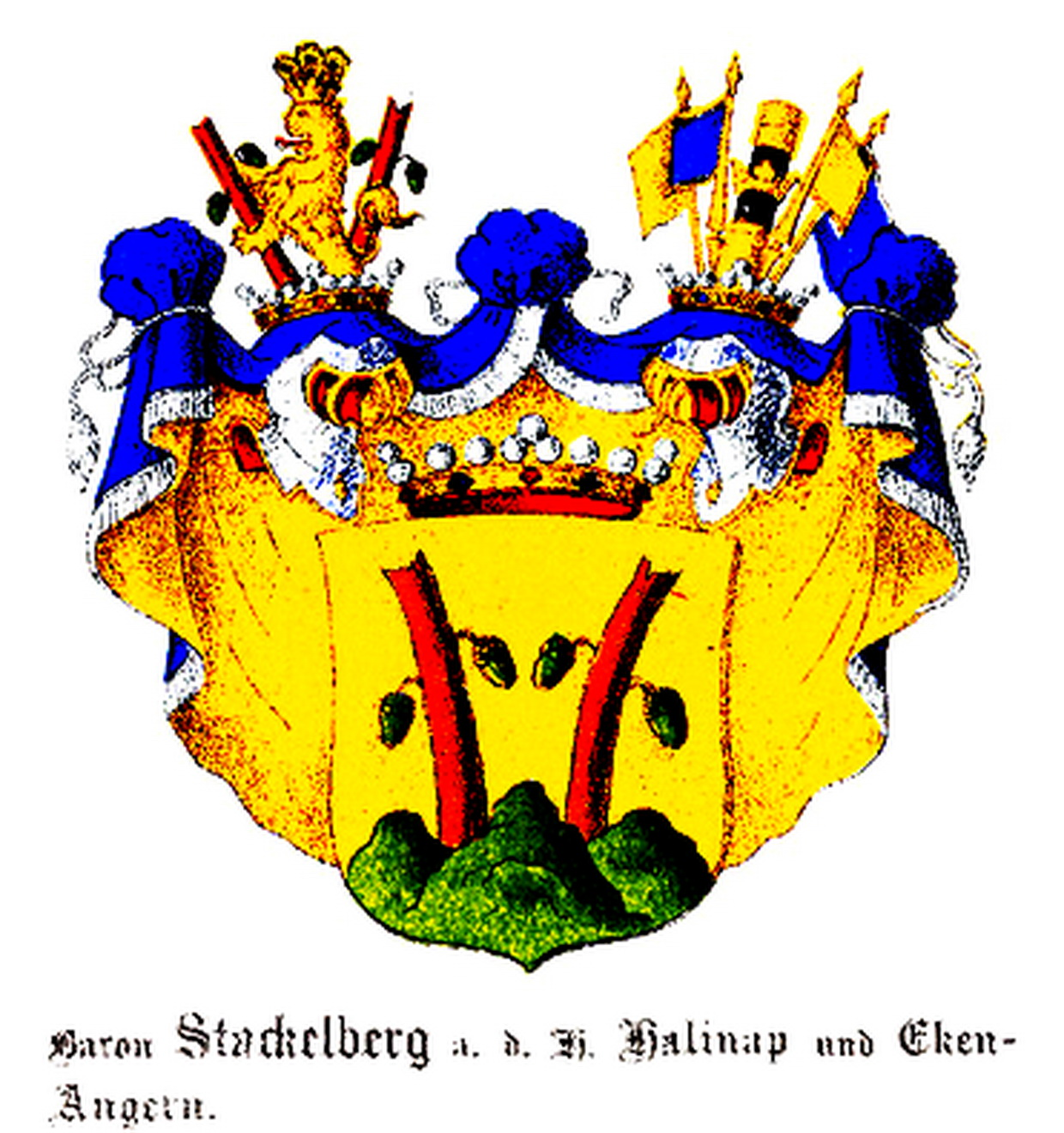
Stackelberg family coat of arms

== Family ==
Stackelberg married Margareta Elisabeth Maidel in 1696 and were together until his death. They had 8 children:

- Georg Johan (1697–1765);
- Helena (1698–1748);
- Hedvig Juliana (1700–1763);
- Margaretha Elisabeth (1701–1773);
- Berndt Otto (1703–1787);
- Wolter Reinhold (1705–1801);
- Christina (1707–1735);
- Anna Catharina (1708–1745)

== See also ==
- List of Swedish field marshals
- Stackelberg family
