= Lyasnaya, Mogilev region =

Coordinates: 53°32′29″N 30°54′53″E

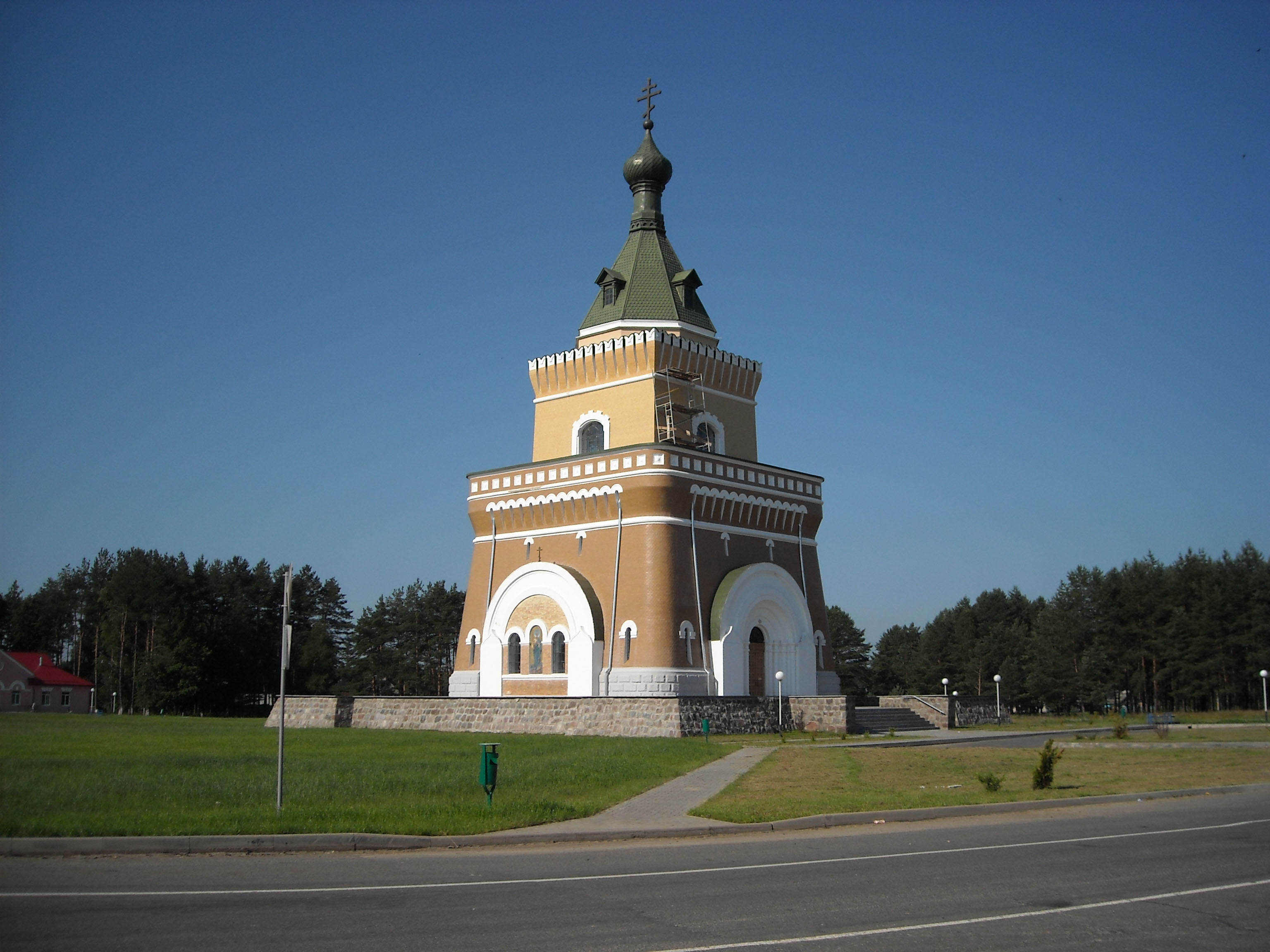
Peter and Paul's chapel

Lyasnaya (Belarusian: Лясная, romanized: Liasnaja; Russian: Лесная, romanized: Lesnaya; Polish: Leśna) is an agrotown in Slawharad District, Mogilev Region, Belarus.

It is known as the place of the Battle of Lesnaya. There is a memorial chapel (Saints Peter and Paul Church, Lyasnaya) dedicated to the 200th anniversary of the victory over Swedes in the battle.
