= Treaty of Copenhagen (1709) =

1709 alliance between the Russian Empire and Denmark-Norway

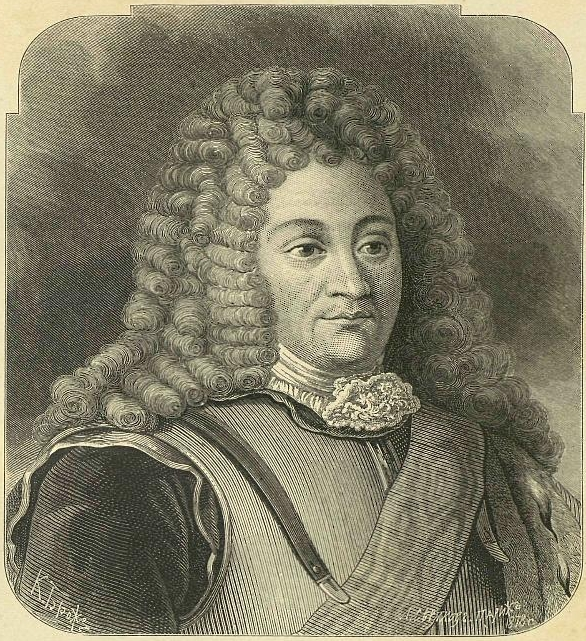
Dolgorukov (Dolgoruky)

On 22 October 1709, during the Great Northern War, the alliance between the Russian Empire and Denmark-Norway was renewed in the Treaty of Copenhagen. Charles XII of Sweden had destroyed the previous alliance in Travendal (1700). For Russia, Vasily Lukich Dolgorukov signed the treaty in Copenhagen.

== See also ==
- Treaty of Copenhagen (disambiguation), for other treaties known by this name

== Sources ==
- Anisimov, Evgeniĭ Viktorovich (1993). The reforms of Peter the Great. Progress through coercion in Russia. The New Russian history. M.E. Sharpe. p. 125. ISBN 1-56324-047-5.
