= Mejlbystenen =

Runestone at Mejlby, near Randers, Denmark

Coordinates: 56°31′10″N 10°05′01″E

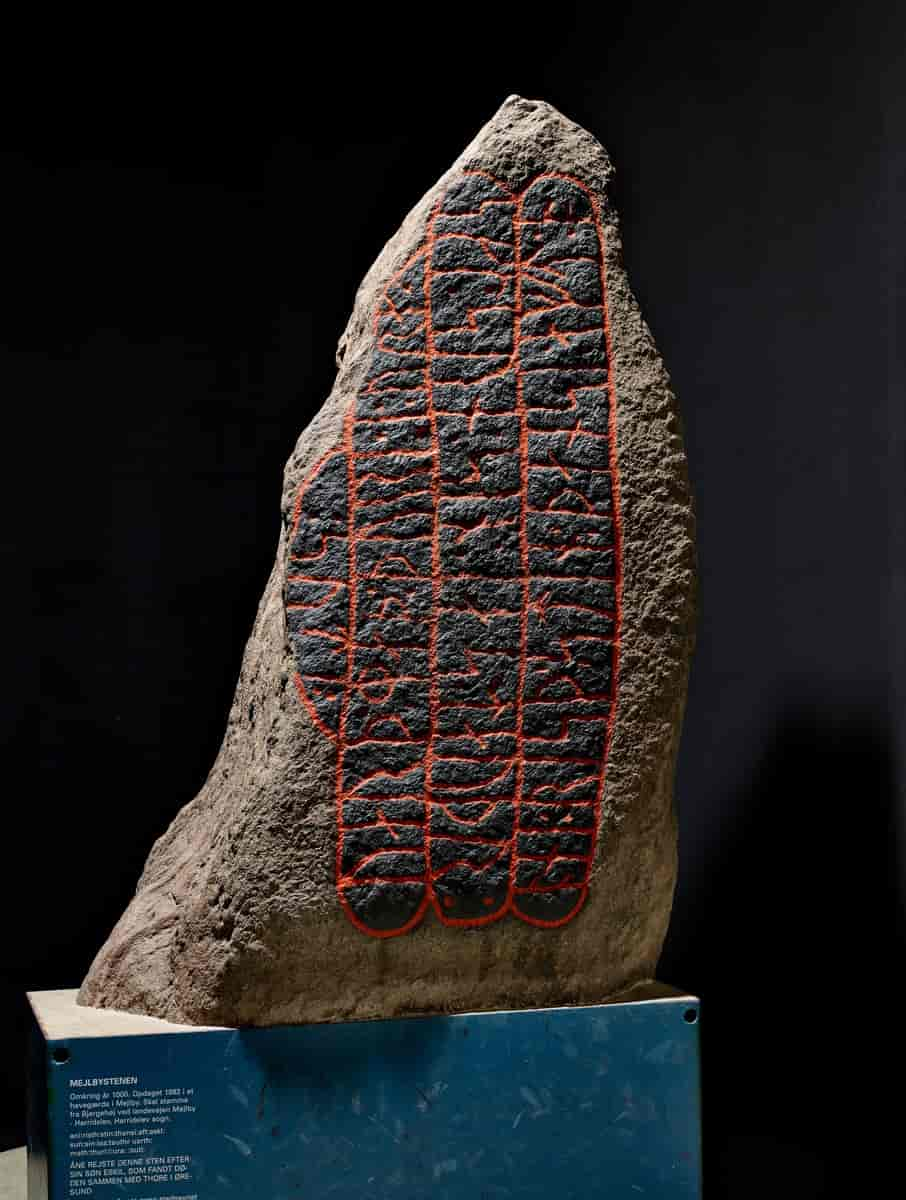
At Nationalmuseet

The Mejlbystenen, also known as runic inscription DR 117 from its Rundata catalog listing, is an approximately 1,000-year-old runestone originally located at Mejlby, near Randers in Denmark. According to a new interactive exhibit of the stone at the Randers Kulturhistoriske Museum, which differs slightly from the accepted Rundata translation, the stone reads:

Åne erected this stone for his son Eskil who found death with Thore in Øresund

The inscription has been classified as being carved in runestone style RAK.

== Inscription ==
=== Transliteration of the runes into Latin characters ===
oni : risþ : stin : þansi : aft : o¶skl : sun : sin : ias : tauþr ¶ uarþ : maþ : þuri : i : ura:¶:suti :

=== Transcription into Old Norse ===
Áni reisti stein þenna ept Áskel, son sinn, er dauðr varð með Þóri í Eyrasundi.

=== Translation in English ===
Áni raised this stone in memory of Áskell, his son, who died with Þórir in The Sound.
