= Sound Dues =

Historical toll on the use of the Øresund

Coordinates: 55°47′23″N 12°45′03″E

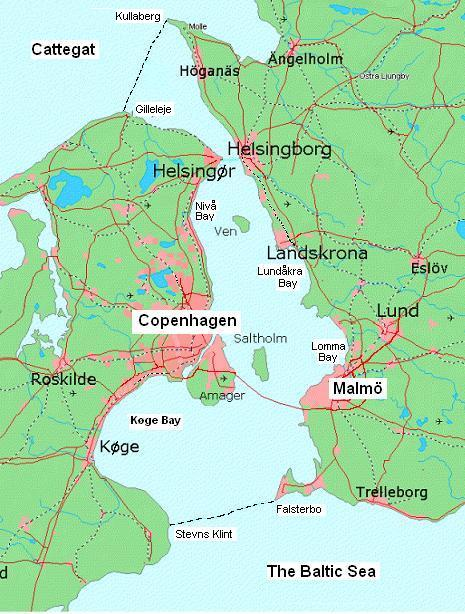
Modern map of the Øresund. The Danish coast line is to the west, and the Swedish coast line is to the east.

The Sound Dues (or Sound Tolls; Danish: Øresundstolden) were a toll on the use of the Øresund strait (also known in English as the Sound), separating the modern day borders of Denmark and Sweden. The tolls constituted up to two thirds of Denmark's state income in the 16th and 17th centuries. The dues were introduced by King Eric of Pomerania in 1429 and remained in effect until the Copenhagen Convention of 1857 (with the sole exception of Swedish ships between 1645 and 1720). Tolls in the Great Belt had been collected by the Danish Crown at least a century prior to the establishment of the dues by Eric of Pomerania.

== History ==
All foreign ships passing through the strait, whether en route to or from Denmark or not, had to stop in Helsingør and pay a toll to the Danish Crown. If a ship's captain refused to stop, cannons in both Helsingør and Helsingborg could open fire and sink the vessel. In 1567, the toll was changed into a 1–2% tax on the cargo value, providing three times more revenue. To keep the captains from understating the value of the cargo on which the tax was computed, the right to purchase the cargo at the stated value was reserved.

In order to avoid ships simply taking a different route, tolls were also collected at the two other Danish straits, the Great Belt and the Little Belt; sometimes non-Danish vessels were forbidden to use any other waterways but the Øresund, and transgressing vessels were confiscated or sunk.

The Sound Dues remained the most important source of income for the Danish Crown for several centuries, thus making Danish kings relatively independent of Denmark's Privy Council and aristocracy. However, the dues were an irritant to nations engaged in trade in the Baltic Sea, especially Sweden. Sweden had initially been exempted from the dues at the time of their introduction because it was then in the Kalmar Union along with Denmark. However, after the Kalmar War and the Treaty of Knäred in 1613 Denmark-Norway introduced dues on cargoes from Sweden's Baltic possessions and on non-Swedish ships carrying Swedish cargo. The friction over the dues was an official casus belli ('reason for war') of the Torstenson War in 1643.

In 1645, at the Treaty of Brömsebro, Denmark-Norway had to cede the provinces Jämtland and Härjedalen as well as the Baltic Sea islands of Gotland and Saaremaa (Ösel) to Sweden as a consequence of the Torstenson War. Swedish shipping also became exempt from the Sound Dues by the terms of this treaty. In 1658, Denmark-Norway had to cede Scania, Blekinge and Halland (and some other provinces) to Sweden in the Treaty of Roskilde as a consequence of the Dano-Swedish War, and the eastern shore of the Sound has been Swedish since then. The exemption from the Sound Dues were withdrawn after Sweden's defeat in the Great Northern War at the Treaty of Frederiksborg of 1720.

=== Abolition ===
The Copenhagen Convention, which came into force on 14 March 1857, abolished the dues and all Danish Straits were made international waterways free to all commercial shipping.

== Statistics ==
Year	Ships passing through the Sound
1479	795
1537	1897
1560	2731
1581	4262
1583	5400

== See also ==
- Skibsklarerergaarden
- Iranian sovereignty over the Strait of Hormuz
- Harberger Tax
