= Alexander Gordon (general) =

Russian general (1669–1752)

Alexander Gordon of Auchintoul (6 January 1670 [O.S. 27 December 1669] – July 1752) was a Scottish general who fought in the Russian army under Peter the Great in 1696–1711, and for the Jacobites in the Jacobite rising of 1715.

He is mentioned as "Sandy Don" in the song Cam Ye O'er Frae France.

He wrote a history of Peter the Great, including a brief account of his own life, which was published in Aberdeen in 1755 and in Leipzig in 1765. It is now available online:

- The History of Peter the Great, Emperor of Russia: To which is Prefixed a Short General History of the Country from the Rise of that Monarchy: and an Account of the Author's Life. Vol. I
- The History of Peter the Great, Emperor of Russia Vol. II
