= Treaty of Copenhagen (1441) =

1441 treaty between Hanseatic League and Burgundian Netherlands

The Treaty of Copenhagen (or the Peace of Copenhagen) was signed in 1441 between the Hanseatic League and the Burgundian Netherlands, ending the Dutch-Hanseatic War.

The accord was developed after Christopher of Bavaria crushed a great peasant uprising in Northern Jutland. The treaty broke the attempted monopoly of Baltic trading routes by the Hanseatic League. Even though Hanseatic trade regulations did not change, the Dutch (with their larger trading vessels) increased their control on herring fisheries, the French salt trade, and the Baltic grain trade.

In short, the Baltic Sea was open and influenced by Dutch traders. The Hanseatic merchants eventually became middlemen whereby they transported bulk goods (i.e. lumber, grain, fish) from the Baltic and exchanged them for textiles and other finished products. The treaty did not affect the control of Hanse trading outposts in London, Bruges, Danzig, and Bergen. Based on the terms of the agreement, Dutch towns promised to pay or return twenty-two lost Prussian and Livonian ships. Moreover, the Dutch would pay 5,000 guldens to the Danish king to maintain their trading privileges in Denmark, as well as pay the damages they made to Wendish towns.

== See also ==
- List of treaties
