= Copenhagen Convention of 1857 =

Maritime treaty regarding Danish Straits

Treaty for the Redemption of the Sound Dues
- Type: Multilateral maritime treaty
- Signed: 14 March 1857
- Location: Copenhagen, Denmark
- Effective: 1 April 1857
- Expiry: Perpetual
- Signatories: Denmark; United Kingdom; Russian Empire (Kingdom of Prussia) Prussia (Union between Sweden and Norway) Sweden-Norway; France (Province of Hanover) Hanover (Grand Duchy of Mecklenburg-Schwerin) Mecklenburg-Schwerin (Grand Duchy of Oldenburg) Oldenburg; Lübeck; Hamburg (Bremen (state)) Bremen; Belgium; Netherlands
- Depositary: Government of Denmark
- Language: French

The Copenhagen Convention, which came into force on 14 March 1857, is a maritime treaty governing transit passage through the Danish Straits.

== Provisions ==
It abolished the Sound Dues and all Danish Straits have been made international waterways free to all commercial shipping. Its provisions were later reaffirmed by Article 282 of the Treaty of Versailles, becoming binding for its parties. Although the Convention does not cover warships, military vessels have also been free to traverse the straits, regulated by the general international rule of innocent passage through international straits and the Royal Ordinance of 1976.

== History ==
It had been increasingly evident that the Sound Dues had a negative impact on the port and merchants of Copenhagen. Although the dues delivered by then one eighth of the Danish state income, the world's seafaring nations were becoming less and less tolerant of these tolls and restrictions. In compensation for the abolition, the Danish state received a one-time fee of 33.5 million Danish rigsdalers (equivalent to 2145 million kr. in 2022), paid to Denmark by the other European shipping nations who signed the convention. Of the total fee, Great Britain paid approximately one third, and Russia another third. A similar convention between Denmark and the United States, signed in Washington the same year, gave American ships free passage in perpetuity for a one-time fee of $393,000 (equivalent to $13,580,000 in 2025).

A number of canals were built in part due to difficulty in passing the Danish Straits.

- Kiel Canal
- Göta Canal
- Eider Canal
