= Swedish invasion of Russia =

Part of the Great Northern War (1708–1709)

Swedish invasion of Russia Poltava campaign
- Part of the Great Northern War
- 1922 map of the Poltava campaign from Baturyn to Perevolochna
Date	1 January 1708 — 11 July 1709
Location	Belarus (Polish–Lithuanian Commonwealth, January–October 1708); Ukraine (Cossack Hetmanate, November 1708 – July 1709); Tsardom of Russia
Result	Russian victory

Belligerents
Tsardom of Russia; Cossack Hetmanate; Kalmyk Khanate; Sandomierz Confederation	(yes) Swedish Empire; Cossack supporters of Mazepa (from October 1708); Warsaw Confederation

Commanders and leaders
Peter the Great; Aleksandr Menshikov; Ivan Mazepa (until October 1708); Ayuka Khan	(yes) Charles XII (yes) Adam Ludwig Lewenhaupt; Ivan Mazepa (from October 1708)

Strength
192,000 (Note: 121,000 Russians of which 57,500 directly under Peter I stationed between Severia and Smolensk, 24,500 at Saint Petersburg under Fyodor Apraksin, 16,000 at Dorpat under Christian Felix Bauer, 12,000 at Kiev under Mikhail Mikhailovich Golitsyn and 11,000 at Moscow. Another 12,000 men were used to beat the Bulavin Rebellion, however these were only able to assist in the fight against the Swedes at the end of the campaign. 35,000–40,000 Cossacks by Ivan Mazepa and Kost Hordiienko and 10,000 Kalmyk troops by Ayuka Khan. 23,500 Poles under Adam Mikołaj Sieniawski in Poland.)	97,000 (Note: 77,000 Swedes of which 33,000 directly under Karl XII at Grodno, 22,000 in Livonia, Ingria and Courland under Adam Ludwig Lewenhaupt, 14,000 in Finland under Georg Lybecker and 8,000 in Poland under Ernst Detlof von Krassow with about 20,000 Poles under Stanisław I.)

Casualties and losses
21,675–26,248 combat casualties Thousands froze to death	15,088–19,085 combat casualties 14,800–20,000+ captured 13,759 froze to death

The Swedish invasion of Russia, also known as the Russian campaign, (Note: Russian: Русский поход Карла XII.) or Poltava campaign of Charles XII of Sweden, was undertaken from January 1708 to July 1709 during the Great Northern War. The campaign began with Charles's crossing of the Vistula on 1 January 1708, and effectively ended with the Swedish defeat in the Battle of Poltava on 8 July 1709, after which the Swedish surrender at Perevolochna occurred on 11 July 1709. Though Charles continued to pose a military threat to Russia for several years while under the protection of the Ottoman Empire, the 18-month campaign was a turning point in the overall war.

== Historical context ==
In the years preceding the invasion of Russia, Charles had inflicted significant defeats on the Danish and Polish forces, and enthroned the king Stanisław Leszczyński in the Polish–Lithuanian Commonwealth controlled by the pro-Swedish Warsaw Confederation. Having consolidated his victories there, he invaded Saxony, forcing it out of the war in 1706. While the war of succession was raging across the Commonwealth between the pro-Swedish Warsaw Confederation and the anti-Swedish Sandomierz Confederation, Russia exploited the opportunity to invade and occupy most of Belarus from December 1704 to March 1705.

Charles then turned his attention to Russia, and Russian-occupied Belarus. He was a skilled military leader, and probably considered the invasion to be a risky enterprise; he had resisted the advice of his generals to invade during the winter following the first Battle of Narva (1700). His plan appears to have been to march from Warsaw on the Vistula in central Poland to Grodno, Minsk and Orsha in modern Belarus, proceeding via Smolensk to eventually capture the tsar's capital city of Moscow. (Note: In 1703, Peter had already ordered the construction of Saint Petersburg on the site of the captured Swedish fortress of Nyenschantz on the Neva in 1703; this would become the capital of Russia from 1712 onwards. Peter exploited Ukrainian soldiers of Left-Bank regiments as forced labour to dig canals in and around Saint Petersburg, leading many Cossacks to die from cold and disease.)

Charles had 40,000 soldiers, approximately half of them cavalry. This tactic was characteristic of his military style, which relied on moving armies with great speed over unexpected terrain.

== Campaign ==
=== March through Belarus (February–October 1708) ===
The Battle of Grodno (Hrodna) on 7 February 1708 was a relatively small first clash, followed by the larger Battle of Holowczyn (Haloůchyn) on 14 July 1708, a costly tactical Swedish victory. The Battle of Malatitze (10 September 1708) was indecisive, but the Swedes forced the Russians to retreat. The Battle of Rajovka (20 September 1708) was a clear Swedish victory, but after the army reached Tatarsk (modern Monastyrshchinsky District) the following day, the supply convoy of Adam Ludwig Lewenhaupt had still not arrived by 25 September 1708. Charles decided it would be impossible to reach Moscow without it, and that his hungry army had to get food in fertile Ukraine instead. (Note: Alternately, Peter B. Brown (2009) asserted that Charles was "turned away at Starshii, a small town several miles southwest of the all important Smolensk, seizure of which is mandatory for any contemplation of a successful Moscow offensive." He did not mention any date, and only later mentioned "an abundance of Ukrainian foodstuffs" as the reason for Charles to change his course southwards.) Some two weeks later, the supply convoy commanded by Lewenhaupt was defeated in the Battle of Lesnaya (9 October 1708, O.S. 29 September 1708).

=== Mazepa's Cossacks join Sweden ===
Poltava campaign map by Mykhailo Hrushevsky (1921)

Meanwhile, the Hetman of the Cossack Hetmanate Ivan Mazepa had been in correspondence with the Polish allies of Charles XII to explore his options. He had been loyal to his protector Peter I for over two decades, but Moscow had been encroaching on the administrative and cultural autonomy of Ukraine. Moreover, Peter's Russian armies were retreating from all of Belarus, unable to withstand the Swedish advance, except to delay it by scorched earth tactics, wreaking destruction across the land and misery for the population. Finally, when it became clear that the army of Charles was making a detour towards Ukraine, and the tsar had refused to send the Ukrainians any help, and ordered them to burn all towns and villages in Charles' path as well, just as the Russians had done in Belarus, Mazepa refused, and changed sides at the urging of his own colonels. They considered the tsar to have violated his duty to protect the Cossack Hetmanate, as stipulated by the Pereiaslav Agreement of 1654 and many treaties ever since; instead, Mazepa and his colonels began studying the Treaty of Hadiach again, and made diplomatic overtures to Charles as he was advancing towards Ukraine.

=== Sack of Baturyn and the War of Manifestos ===
In early November 1708, Mazepa and a group of trusted courtiers with a small detachment of Cossacks departed from the Ukrainian capital city of Baturyn in order to meet up with the advancing army of Charles XII. He did not publish any agitation pamphlets against Peter yet for operational security and personal security, hoping that the tsar would take some time to find out about his moves. Yet, Peter found out much sooner than expected, and sent general Aleksandr Danilovich Menshikov with a large Russian to capture Baturyn quickly. The Muscovites took the Ukrainian capital by surprise, and committed the Sack of Baturyn on 2 November 1708: not only were the military supplies and provisions that Mazepa had prepared for his own army and the Swedes captured, but the entire city was destroyed and razed to the ground, its population massacred (over 10,000 defenders and civilians, including women and children were killed). The conflict between Hetman Mazepa and Tsar Peter, known as the War of Manifestos (autumn 1708 – spring 1709), had begun: the tsar accused the hetman of treason, and the hetman accused the tsar of violating all the treaties between the Ukrainian Hetmanate and the Russian Tsardom of the past 150 years.

"Moscow, that is, the Great Russian nation, has always been hateful to our Little Russian nation (Ukraine); in its malicious intentions it has long resolved to drive our nation to perdition."

— Ivan Mazepa (December 1708)

Meanwhile, however, Peter employed all the state power of the tsardom to bear on Mazepa, appointing another hetman to take his place, to have the Russian Orthodox Church pronounce an anathema against Mazepa, to threaten the same to all those who dared to follow Mazepa, and to pressure all the rank-and-file Cossacks, townspeople and peasants to join the Muscovite side. Several colonels who had pledged their support to Mazepa, even those who had pressured him to defect to Sweden, themselves defected back to Muscovy, or failed to deliver military reinforcements to Mazepa as they had promised. By the time of the Battle of Poltava, more Cossacks were on the Muscovite side than on the side of Charles and Mazepa.

Moreover, the Battle of Koniecpol (21 November 1708) completely turned the tide of the succession struggle in Poland: the Sandomierz Confederation crushed the Warsaw Confederation, and would soon restore the Polish–Lithuanian Commonwealth under the anti-Swedish king Augustus II the Strong. This left the combined armies of Sweden and Ukraine isolated on the Left Bank of the Dnipro.

=== Early 1709 ===
By the end of the winter of 1708–1709, the "Great Frost of 1709" had devastated the Swedish army and shrunk it to 24,000 men. In January 1709, the Swedish-Cossack forces managed to win the Siege of Veprik, and on 8 February the Battle of Oposhnya, both in present-day Poltava Oblast. Charles ventured into Sloboda Ukraine, hoping to meet the Russian army in a decisive battle at Okhtyrka, but apart from the relatively small Battle of Krasnokutsk–Gorodnoye (21 February 1709) in which the Swedes routed the Russians, the latter managed to avoid a major pitched engagement.

=== Zaporizhian Cossacks join Sweden ===
In March 1709, Mazepa managed to convince the Zaporizhian Cossacks, led by Kish otaman Kost Hordiienko of the Chortomlyk Sich, to join him in supporting the Swedish side against Russia. Hordiienko's Cossacks defeated the Russian forces at the Battle of Tsarichanka (1709) on 6 April 1709. Out of revenge, the Russians destroyed the Chortomlyk Sich on 25 May 1709. The Zaporizhian Cossacks would establish the new Kamianka Sich shortly thereafter.

The Battle of Sokilka (23 April) on the Vorskla between the Swedes and Muscovites remained inconclusive.

The Siege of Poltava began on 7 April 1709 at the recommendation of Mazepa to Charles: this city in the southern Cossack Hetmanate was essential to capture. When a storming failed, Charles began besieging and bombarding the city in an attempt to force its capitulation.

=== Battle of Poltava ===
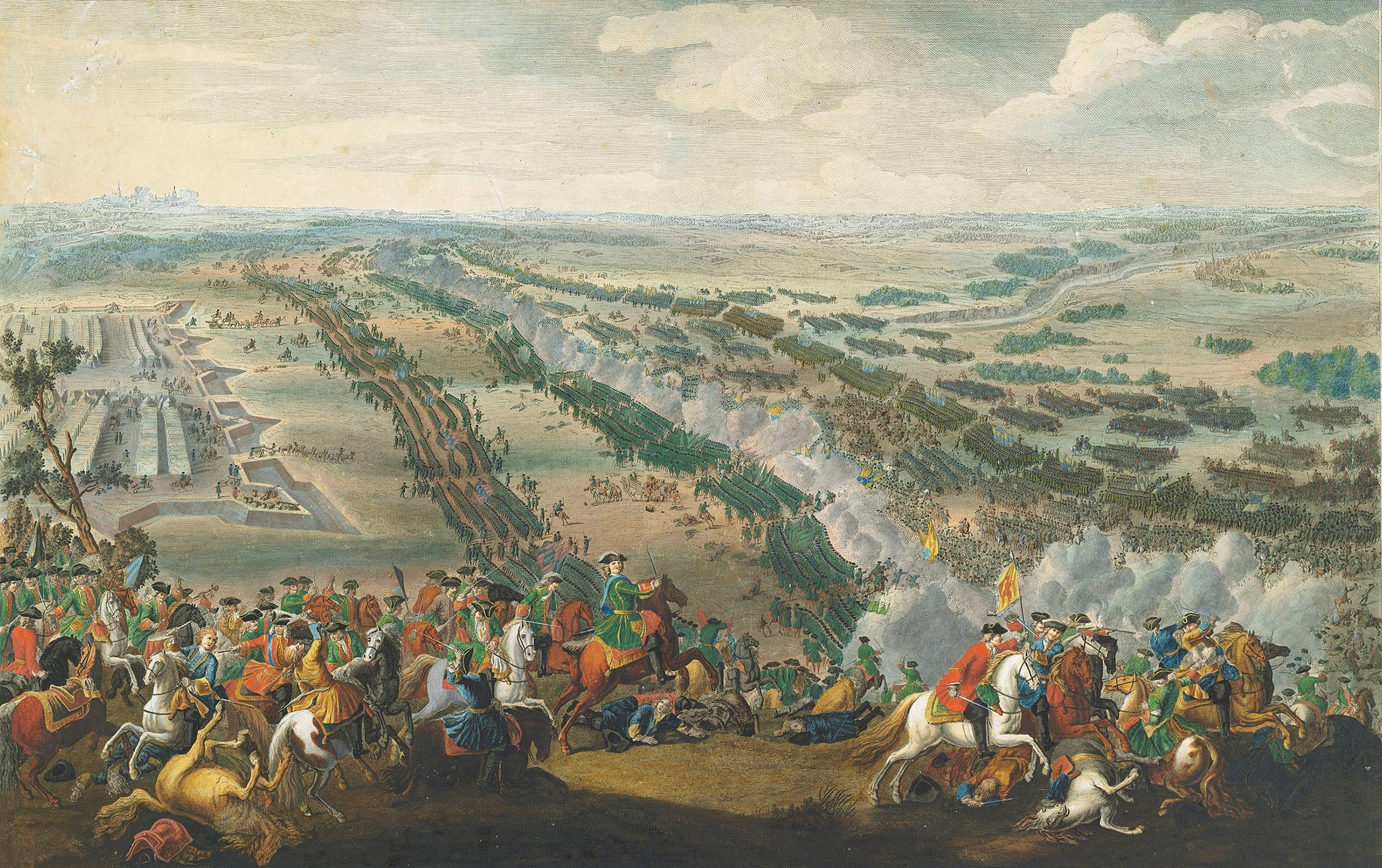
The Battle of Poltava by Pierre-Denis Martin

In May 1709, the Swedish forces caught up to the Russians, and in early July, the two armies clashed in the Battle of Poltava. The Swedish were defeated, and the greater part of Charles's army, some 19,000 men, were forced to surrender at Perevolochna.

== Aftermath ==
Charles fled with his surviving 543 men to the protection of the Ottoman Turks to the south, who were traditionally hostile to Russia. Here, Charles was eventually able to persuade the Sultan Ahmed III to declare war on Russia. Backed by a Turkish army of 200,000 men, Charles led the Turks into the Russo-Turkish War (1710–1711). Before Charles could give battle, though, Peter was able to bribe the Turkish vizier to make peace; with this, Charles's ambitions to invade Russia were ended.

== Consequences ==
The consequences of the failed invasion were far-reaching. The Swedish Empire never added new territory after the Battle of Poltava, and shortly thereafter lost more possessions. George I of Great Britain led Great Britain and Prussia into war against Sweden, and Denmark reentered the war. Russia maintained its conquered possessions in Ingria and the Baltic, was able to consolidate its hold over Ukraine and Poland, develop the new city of Saint Petersburg, and gain vital trade links in the Baltic trade. During the invasion, no less than 20,000 Swedish soldiers and thousands more civilians fell into Russian captivity.

== Battles ==
Battle	Swedish numbers	Russian numbers	Swedish casualties	Russian casualties	Result
Grodno	800	9,000	54	200	Swedish victory
Holowczyn	12,500	28,000	1,293	1,655–6,000	Swedish victory
Malatitze	4,000	13,000	700–2,000	1,566–2,700	See Aftermath
Rajovka	2,400	10,000	100	375	Swedish victory
Lesnaya	12,500	26,500–29,000	3,000–3,873	7,000	Russian victory
Desna	2,000	4,000	200	1,700	Swedish victory
Veprik	3,000	1,500	1,000–1,600	1,500	Swedish victory
Oposhnya	2,000	6,000	19	450	Swedish victory
Krasnokutsk-Gorodnoye	2,500	5,000–10,000	132	774–1,200	Swedish victory
Sokilka	6,000	7,000	290	50–1,400	Inconclusive
Stari Sanzhary	Unknown	6 dragoon regiments	Unknown	Unknown	Russian victory
Poltava	17,000	42,000	6,900–9,224 killed/wounded 2,800–2,977 captured	4,635–5,953	Key Russian victory
Perevolochna	12,000	9,000	12,000 captured	Unknown	Swedish surrender

Battles during the Ingrian campaign (August–October 1708)
Battle	Swedish numbers	Russian numbers	Swedish casualties	Russian casualties	Result
Neva	2,000	4,000–8,000	380	900	Swedish victory
Koporye	1,800	2,000–3,000	70	600	Swedish victory
Kolkanpää	600–800	3,000–3,500	600–800	270	Russian victory

== Works cited ==
- Brown, Peter B. (2009). "Gazing Anew at Poltava: Perspectives from the Military Revolution Controversy, Comparative History, and Decision-Making Doctrines". Harvard Ukrainian Studies. 31 (1/4). [The President and Fellows of Harvard College, Harvard Ukrainian Research Institute]: 107–133. ISSN 0363-5570. JSTOR 41756499.
- Plokhy, Serhii (2022). The Gates of Europe: A History of Ukraine. New York, NY: Basic Books. p. 414. ISBN 978-0-465-07394-8.
- Stevens, Carol B. (24 January 2012). "Great Northern War". In Martel, Gordon (ed.). The Encyclopedia of War, 5 Volume Set. John Wiley & Sons. pp. 885–889. ISBN 978-1-4051-9037-4.
- Tairova-Yakovleva, Tatiana (2020). Ivan Mazepa and the Russian Empire (PDF). Montreal Kingston London Chicago: McGill-Queen's Press. p. 425. ISBN 978-0-2280-0309-0.
- Wolke, Lars Ericson [in Swedish] (2025). Mot Sankt Petersburg! Den karolinska arméns desperata kamp 1708 [Towards Saint Petersburg! The desperate struggle of the Carolean army in 1708] (in Swedish). Carlssons. ISBN 9789189826557.
