= Battle of the Neva (1708) =

Battle of the Great Northern War (1708)

- Part of the Ingrian campaign (1708)
Date	29 August 1708 (O.S.); 30 August 1708 (Swedish calendar); 9 September 1708 (N.S.)
Location	Neva River, Russia 59°57′10″N 31°02′10″E
Result	Swedish victory
Territorial changes	Swedes cross the Neva

Belligerents
Swedish Empire	Tsardom of Russia

Commanders and leaders
(Swedish Empire) Georg Lybecker	(Tsardom of Russia) Fyodor Apraksin

Strength
2,000	4,000–8,000

Casualties and losses
300	377 to 900

The Battle of the Neva took place on 9 September 1708, during the Ingrian campaign of 1708 in the Great Northern War.

== Prelude ==
While Charles XII had started his offensive against Russia from his winter quarters in Saxony, the Swedish–Finnish army of 12,000–14,000 men under the command of Georg Lybecker went in field to interrupt and possibly capture the newly established ports and town of Saint Peterburg, which had been built on Swedish land. This was intended to draw the attention and troops from the main Russian army facing Charles. The Russian forces stationed in Russian-controlled Swedish Ingria consisted of 24,500 men of which the command had been appointed to Fyodor Apraksin. While having reached the river of Neva the Swedes under Lybecker prepared their crossing. Apraksin had fortified the opposite bank with about 8,000 men and several boats patrolling the river.

== Battle ==
Lybecker first confused the Russian command of where the possible crossing were to be made and so, on 9 September, close to Teusina, his forces started the construction of the bridge. Meanwhile, two Russian brigantines spotted the work and started firing. The Swedes, however, responded with their own cannons and soon the Russian ships had to withdraw. Later after some smaller skirmishes, about 1,200 Swedes were across the river constructing fortifications. The Russians then counterattacked in full force, between 4,000 and 8,000 men. However, the Swedes made a fierce stand and the Russians were, after an hour of fighting including a hasty bayonet charge from the Swedes, soundly defeated leaving 900 men dead behind while having an unknown number of wounded. The Swedes claimed to have lost 86 men dead and 291 wounded in this action. While Russian sources, referring to later interrogations of Swedish prisoners, mention a Swedish loss of 200–303 killed and 100–210 wounded; the larger and more detailed figures coming from a Swedish quartermaster.

== Aftermath ==
The battle had no real strategic effect as Lybeckers' force could not capture Saint Petersburg due to lack of heavy artillery. Instead, after some further campaigning in Russian-controlled Ingria, in which a battle was fought at Koporye, Lybecker ran out of supplies and had to retreat to the open water to get his army evacuated back to Finland. During the Evacuation of Kolkanpää, he had to slaughter and leave behind many of his well–needed horses, a circumstance which would have serious consequences in the Russian invasion of Finland.
