= Ivan Botsis =

Count Ivan Fedoseevich Botsis (Greek: Ιωάννης Μπότσης, Russian: Иван Федосеевич Боцис, died 18 May 1714) was a Russian admiral of Greek descent and one of the main founders of the Imperial Russian Navy under Peter the Great.

== Life ==
Botsis was a Greek from Dalmatia, and served in the Venetian galley fleet for 17 years. He was hired for Russian service by Pyotr Andreyevich Tolstoy in 1702. At the time, Russia was engaged in the Great Northern War and the Tsar tried to westernize Russia and establish a modern navy. Many foreigners were therefore invited to Russia and employed in high positions as experts. After his arrival in Russia in 1703, Botsis was appointed as shautbenaht (a Dutch title equivalent to Counter Admiral) and head of the galley squadrons of the newly established Baltic Fleet, based at Saint Petersburg and the fortress of Kronstadt.

From this position, Botsis oversaw the construction of the Baltic galley fleet. In 1704–1705, he helped General Robert Bruce, the commander of St. Petersburg, to repulse the attacks of a Swedish army under General Maidel. In 1708 the fleet under Botsis successfully attacked the Finnish coast, capturing the town of Borgå (Porvoo), raiding the surrounding villages and burning 15 Swedish merchant ships. In 1710, he commanded a fleet of 270 vessels, and managed to break through the ice-covered sea to bring supplies and reinforcements to the forces besieging the city of Vyborg.

In 1712, a 14,000 strong Swedish army under General Georg Henrik Lybecker was threatening St. Petersburg. On the night of August 10, Botsis with two dozen ships broke through the Swedish blockade, raided the Swedish coastal positions, and captured 6 warships.

In 1713 he commanded the rear guard of the fleet that carried the army of Prince Mikhail Golitsyn to Finland, and participated in the bombardment of Helsinki. His naval abilities and his character were highly esteemed by Peter: together with Vice Admiral Cornelius Cruys, Botsis was proxy father to the Tsar in his wedding to the Empress Catherine on 9 February 1712, and when Botsis died, the Tsar took his sword as a souvenir and gave pensions to his family.

== Sources ==
- (in Russian) Боцис, граф Иван Федосеевич at biografija.ru
- (in Russian) Боцис, Иван Федосеевич
- (in Russian) ШАУТБЕНАХТ БОЦИС, Морской флот No.5 (2007), at morflot.su
