= Great Wrath =

Period of Finnish history from 1714 to 1721

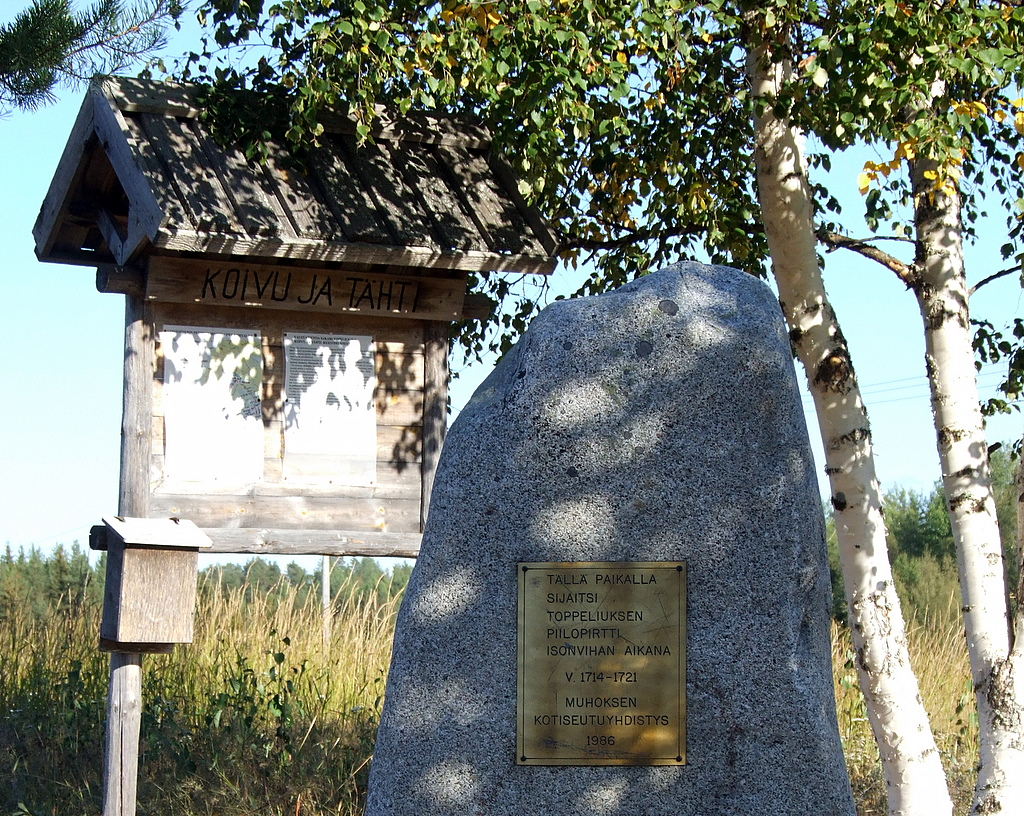
Memorial stone for the Great Wrath in Muhos, Finland

The Great Wrath (Note: Finnish: isoviha, lit. 'the great wrath/hostility', in contemporary sources: venäläisen ylivallan aika, lit. 'era of Russian domination/supremacy'; Swedish: Den Stora Ofreden, lit. 'The Great Unrest') was the period of Russian military occupation in Finland during the final phase of the Great Northern War. At the time, Finland was part of the Swedish Empire. The occupation lasted from 1714 until the Treaty of Nystad in 1721.

== Background ==
While Sweden enjoyed initial successes during the Ingrian campaign of August–October 1708, setbacks compelled commander Georg Lybecker to conduct the Evacuation of Kolkanpää (27 October 1708), abandoning the plans to drive the Russian occupiers out of Swedish Ingria. The subsequent Battle of Poltava in July 1709 devastated the Swedish forces and allies led by king Charles XII, granting the initiative for offensive action back the Russians, who began besieging Riga in November 1709. Finland was left largely to fend for itself. The Russians laid siege to Viborg in March 1710, ultimately seizing the city in June, and by 1712 had already started their first campaign to capture Finland, which ended in failure.

A more organised campaign, beginning in 1713, succeeded at the Battle of Helsinki and drove defending Swedes away from the coast. The Swedish army in Finland was defeated at the Battle of Napue (Storkyro, Isokyrö, Napue)]] on 2 March 1714 (N.S.) with a key Russian victory. Swedish efforts to hinder the Russian advance by blockading the coastal sea route at Hangö ended in failure on 7 August (N.S.) at the Battle of Gangut. In the end, the presence of a Russian galley fleet in the Gulf of Bothnia forced both the Swedish fleet and army to largely abandon Finland in late 1714. As a result of the conflict, large areas of Swedish land were destroyed by the Russians, including the city of Umeå, which was burned to the ground on 18 September 1714 and, after struggling to rebuild, was razed again in 1720, 1721, and 1722.

== Russian military occupation of Finland ==
After the victory at the Battle of Storkyro, Mikhail Golitsyn was appointed the governor of Finland. Finns began waging partisan warfare against the Russians, and as retaliation, the Finnish peasants were forced to pay large contributions to them, as was the custom at the time. Plundering and raping were widespread, especially in Ostrobothnia and in communities near the major roads. Churches were looted and Isokyrö was burned to the ground. A scorched-earth zone, several hundred kilometres wide, was created by the Russians to hinder Swedish counter-offensives. At least 5,000 Finns were killed and some 10,000 taken away as slaves, of whom only a few thousand would ever return. According a 2009 study, the number of casualties would have been closer to 20,000. Recent research also estimates the number of enslaved children and women to have been closer to 30,000. The most severe of these massacres took place on 29 September 1714, when during one night, the Don Cossacks killed about 800 inhabitants of the island of Hailuoto with axes on so-called the "Murder Friday". Thousands fled to the relative safety of Sweden with the poorer peasants hiding in the woods to avoid the occupiers and their press gangs. The atrocities were at their peak between 1714 and 1717 when the Swedish Count Gustaf Otto Douglas, who had defected to the Russian side during the war, was in charge of the occupation.

In addition, Finland was struck by the Great Northern War plague outbreak. In Helsinki, 1,185 people died: nearly two-thirds of the city's population. The plague had already struck Finland before the Russian invasion, sapping the strength of Sweden in Finland.

== Atrocities ==
Many torture methods were used, including hanging captives by the wrists with their hands behind their backs, exposing them to freezing temperatures, or baking them in ovens. When a man named Esko Juhonpoika Eskonsipo returned to Oulunsalo in 1716, only a few of his acquaintances were alive, and "they were also tortured until they were weak". He found the corpses of children as well as tortured people languishing in pain, eventually dying from their injuries. According to Professor Kustaa H. J. Vilkuna, many authentic sources depict the torture. It was not rare for females of any age to be raped and taken as long-term sex slaves. Children, in particular, were taken to Russia as prisoners.

The main reason for the torture was to get information about Finns' money stashes. Finns were forced to reveal the caches, and afterwards they were usually killed. Peter the Great had also twice ordered the destruction of North Ostrobothnia into wasteland, making the conditions impossible for the Swedish army to live in. In Porvoo, corpses of the locals were put on display as early as 1708, some of which had their genitals burned. Typically, all the houses except the soldiers' quarters were burned. Everyone in Kirkonkylä would be killed.

Peasants were slaughtered at Raahe's market square. Matti Puusti laid wounded for the town to see, which lasted for three days before he died. His wife Marjatta was whipped multiple times and later underwent further, more extreme torture in 1716. The peasants were stripped naked and whipped with lead-tipped knotted whips. On some occasions they were made to stand naked in the snow, their backs burned with birch and their eyes blinded with burning tallow.

=== Enslavement ===
The Russian military abducted and enslaved a number of people, many of whom were trafficked via Russia and the Crimean slave trade to Persia and the Middle East, where blonde people were exotic; between 20,000 and 30,000 people are estimated to have been abducted and about a quarter of the Finnish farm houses were reportedly empty at the end of the occupation.

Between 10,000 and 20,000 people were taken to serve as slave labourers during the building of Saint Petersburg. Approximately 2,000 men were forcibly enlisted in the Russian army, but many women and children were also abducted as serfs or sex slaves by Russian officers, who in some cases sold them on to the Crimean slave trade; about 4,600 people, the majority of whom were children, were abducted from Ostrobothnia and Eastern Finland. Many of the Swedish citizens captured and sold by Russian soldiers ended up via the Crimean slave trade in the slave market of Constantinople, where the Swedish ambassador to Constantinople managed to buy the freedom of some, many of whom were women.

A Bayesian reconstruction of Finland’s population gives an estimated total of 383 000 inhabitants in 1721 (95 % credibility interval 333 000–428 000), and if around 30 000 people were taken as slaves during the Great Northern War and the Great Wrath, this would correspond to roughly 7–9 % of the Finnish population at that time.

Annika Svahn, Kustaa Lillbäck and (likely) Afrosinya are examples of Finnish people abducted by the Russians during the Great Wrath.

== Consequences ==
It took several decades for the Finnish population and economy to recover after the peace in 1721. At that point, Finland was scourged again during the Russo-Swedish War of 1741–1743, although less devastatingly.

== Great Wrath in Culture ==
=== Film and TV ===
- The Documentary Djävulens krig (2026), produced by Anders Wik and Simon Staffans, tells about the Great Wrath, battle of Napue and the occupation of Finland by russian forces during the time period.
- The Finnish historical documentary Greater Wrath (Finnish: Isoviha) from 2014 directed by Juha Rinnekari.

== See also ==
- Russification of Finland, policies of the Russian Empire aimed at cultural, social, and political domination of Finland in 1899–1917
- Finlandization, term used to describe political influence of the Soviet Union over Finland during the Cold War in the 20th century
- Grand Duchy of Finland, autonomous state under the Russian Empire in 1809–1917
- History of Finland

== Bibliography ==
- Mattila, Tapani (1983). Meri maamme turvana [Sea Safeguarding Our Country] (in Finnish). Jyväskylä: K. J. Gummerus Osakeyhtiö. ISBN 978-951-99487-0-6.
- Ericson Wolke, Lars (2003). Svenska slagfält (in Swedish). Stockholm: Wahlström & Widstrand. ISBN 978-91-46-20225-7.
