= Russian ship Vyborg =

At least three ships and one ship class of the Imperial Russian Navy have been named Vyborg, after the successful siege of Vyborg in 1710.

- Vyborg-class ship of the line A class of four 50-gun ships built during the Great Northern War.
- Russian ship of the line Vyborg (1710) 50-gun ship that had to be destroyed after running aground in 1712
- Russian ship of the line Vyborg (1729) 54-gun Pyotr II-class ship scrapped after 1739
- Russian ship of the line Vyborg (1841) 74-gun ship later converted to steam power; stricken in 1863
