= Battle of Rajovka =

Battle during the Great Northern War

- Part of the Swedish invasion of Russia
Date	9 September 1708 (O.S.); 10 September 1708 (Swedish calendar); 20 September 1708 (N.S.)
Location	Rayevka, Smolensk Oblast
Result	Swedish victory

Belligerents
Swedish Empire	Tsardom of Russia

Commanders and leaders
Charles XII of Sweden	Christian Felix Bauer

Strength
2,400 cavalry	8,000–10,000 dragoons 1,000 Cossacks and Kalmyks

Casualties and losses
100 killed	375 killed

The Battle of Rajovka took place on 20 September 1708 near Rayevka, Smolensk during the Swedish invasion of Russia in the Great Northern War. The Swedish army of about 2,400 men under the command of Charles XII defeated the Russian army of 10,000 men under Christian Felix Bauer after a fierce cavalry skirmish where the king himself was in great danger.

== Prelude ==
After having fought the battle of Malatitze the victorious Swedish army marched towards Tatarsk (Smolensk Oblast) in order to fight the Russians under tsar Peter I. However, after a while a great number of Russian horse were spotted, having stalked the Swedish units. To draw their attention towards himself, rather than the supply convoy under general Adam Ludwig Lewenhaupt which Charles presumed was close, he decided to force the Russians away.

== Battle ==
Charles immediately put himself in charge of the Östgöta kavalleriregemente to persecute the fleeing Russians. Unknown to the Swedes, a great number of other Russian horse were concealed behind some small woods near the exposed Russian cavalry in order to ambush Charles and his Östgöta cavalry who were running straight into the trap. For the moment, the Swedes had less than 1,000 men against close to 10,000 Russians and Charles' small squadron was quickly surrounded. The Swedes fought valiantly and Charles got his horse shot dead under him. However, they managed to halt the Russian attacks long enough for further Swedish reinforcements to arrive in form of Norra Skånska kavalleriregemente and Smålands kavalleriregemente and so all the Russians were driven away.

== Aftermath ==
The Russians suffered a loss of 375 men killed. The Swedish losses were 100 men killed. Charles XII achieved his goals with the battle, having forced Bauer away from the southern bank of Horodnia, and Lewenhaupt's convoy. The Swedes reached Tatarsk the following day, where they awaited his arrival. On 25 September, with no news from the convoy and no hopes of reaching Moscow without it, Charles XII instead marched his hungry army into fertile Ukraine.
