= Magnus Stiernstråle =

Swedish military officer

Magnus Stiernstråle (died 18 December 1734) was a Swedish military colonel, and was most likely from Livonia.

Stiernstråle became captain of the Hämeenlinna infantry in 1684. When the Great Northern War erupted in 1700, he was lieutenant colonel and commander of the Ivangorod Fortress, which he had to give up on 16 August 1704. In 1710 he became a colonel in Vyborg and Commandant of the Vyborg Fortress, which was fitted with a garrison of only 4,000. In March it was attacked by a numerically superior Russian force under General Fyodor Apraksin.

At first, the Russians, who had not brought any real siege artillery, had little success. Soon, however, when Czar Peter I himself arrived on May 10 with reinforcements and supplies, they gained the upper hand. From this time, they were besieged in a position more and more desperate, and in vain waited for rescue from the Finnish side. Since the city walls to a large extent been destroyed and the crew weakened by disease and suffering, Stiernstråle surrendered on 13 June 1710. Although he was the commander of the defense forces, and much of the bourgeoisie were taken as prisoners to Russia, Stiernstråle was taken to Pinsgorod, from where he first after peace returned in 1721. He was promoted to Major General in 1721, and in 1723 received command of the Savo Regiment.
