= Battle of Koporye =

Battle during the Great Northern War

Coordinates: 59°42′34″N 29°01′58″E

- Part of the Great Northern War
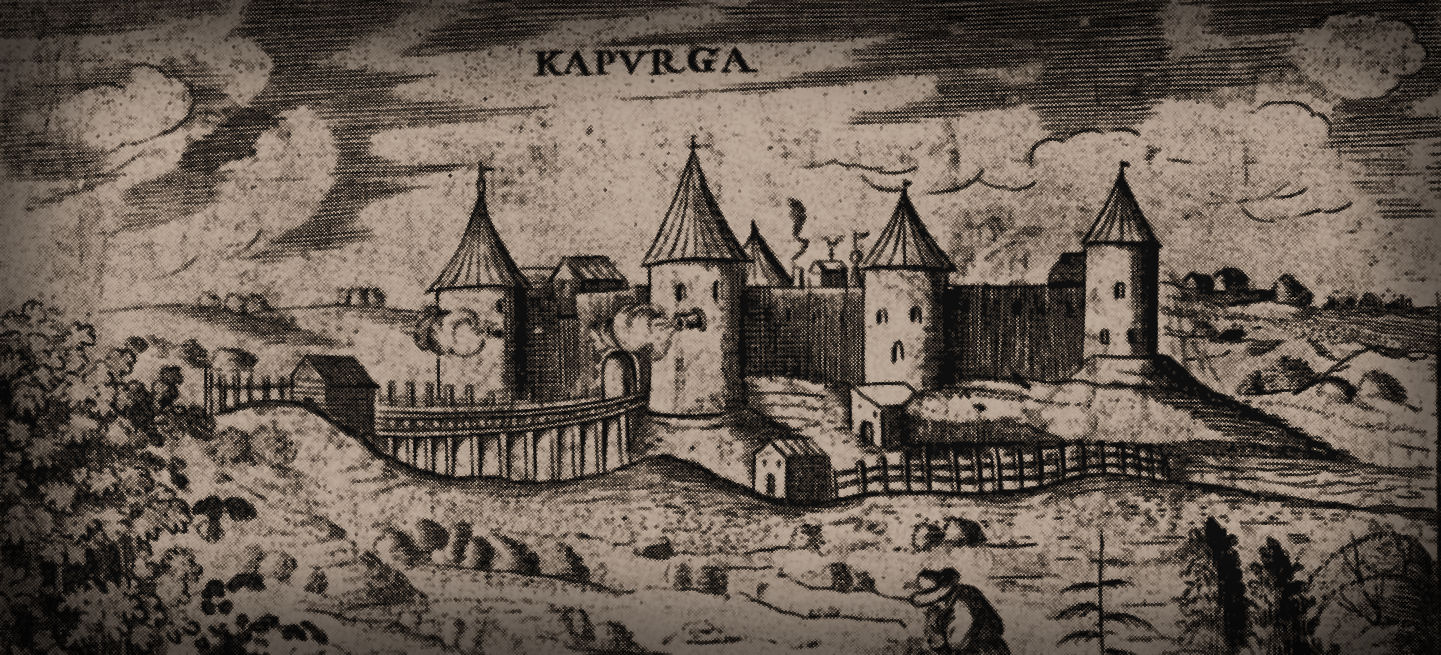
- Koporye Fortress
Date	27 September 1708 (O.S.); 28 September 1708 (Swedish calendar); 8 October 1708 (N.S.)
Location	Koporye, Swedish Empire, present-day Russia
Result	Swedish victory

Belligerents
Swedish Empire	Tsardom of Russia

Commanders and leaders
(Swedish Empire) Carl Gustaf Armfeldt; (Swedish Empire) Anders Erik Ramsay	(Tsardom of Russia) Brigadier Frazer

Strength
1,800 men	2,000–3,000 men

Casualties and losses
70 killed	600 killed

The Battle of Koporye took place on 8 October 1708 (N.S.) close to Koporye, in the Swedish Empire during the Ingrian campaign in the Great Northern War. A Swedish force consisting of 1,800 men under the command of generals Carl Gustaf Armfeldt and Anders Erik Ramsay attacked a numerically stronger enemy of between 2,000 and 3,000 Russian forces. The battle ended in a Swedish victory with about 600 Russians killed and only 70 dead among the Swedish force. After further campaigning, the Swedish–Finland army under the command of Georg Lybecker decided to evacuate his troops, having failed at his objectives.
