= Malyatsichy =

Agrotown in Mogilev Region, Belarus

Malyatsichy Маляцічы (Belarusian) Молятичи (Russian) Molyatichi
- Agrotown
- Location within Belarus
- Coordinates: 53°51′28″N 31°32′30″E
- Country: Belarus
- Region: Mogilev Region
- District: Krychaw District
- Time zone: UTC+3 (MSK)

Malyatsichy or Molyatichi (Belarusian: Маляцічы, romanized: Maliacičy; Russian: Молятичи) is an agrotown in Krychaw District, Mogilev Region, Belarus. It serves as the administrative center of Malyatsichy selsoviet. It is located 25 kilometres (16 mi) northwest of Krychaw and 129 kilometres (80 mi) from Mogilev. In 2010, it had a population of 350 residents.

== History ==
In 1708, the settlement was the location of the Battle of Malatitze during the Great Northern War.

Before World War II, it was a shtetl. The Germans occupied the city from 1941 to 1944.

In November 1941, as part of the Holocaust in Belarus, between 70 and 122 Jews were killed in Molyatichi. The Jews were shot with a bullet in the back. Some children were thrown alive in the grave. There were nine shooters: six Germans and three local policemen. One week after the shooting, the Germans organized an auction to sell the Jews' belongings.

== Gallery ==
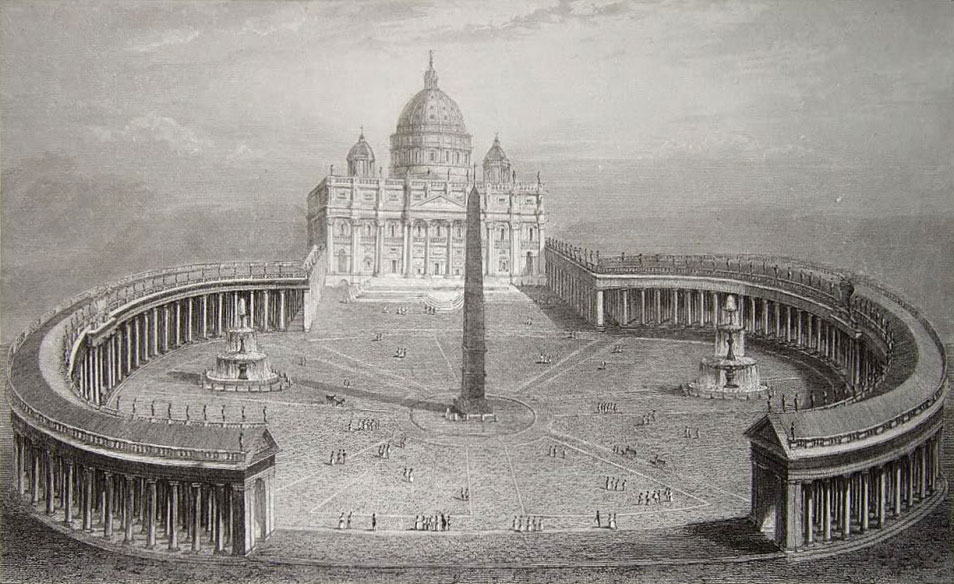
Church of St. Stanislaus, 1846–1847

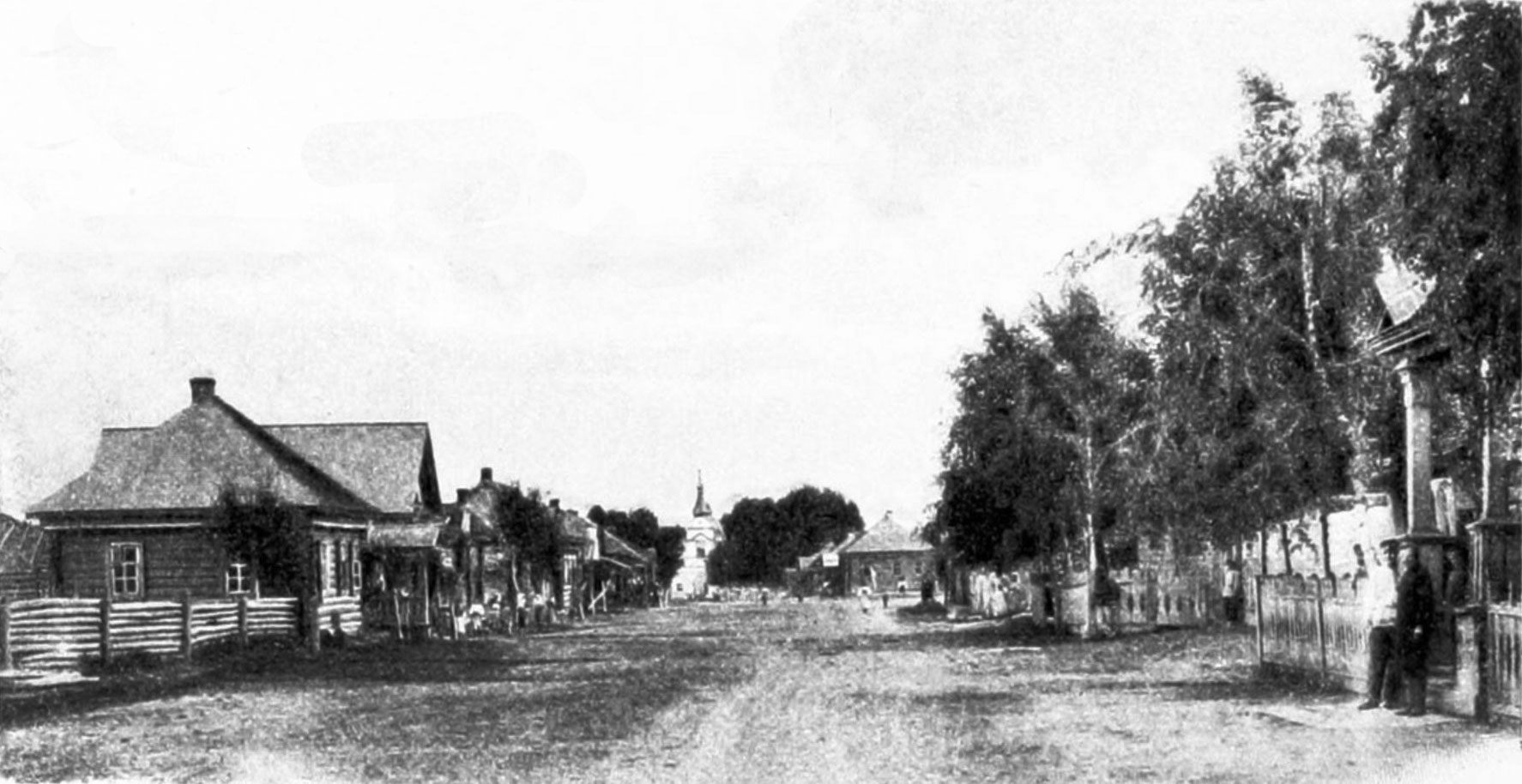
Malyatsichy in 1905

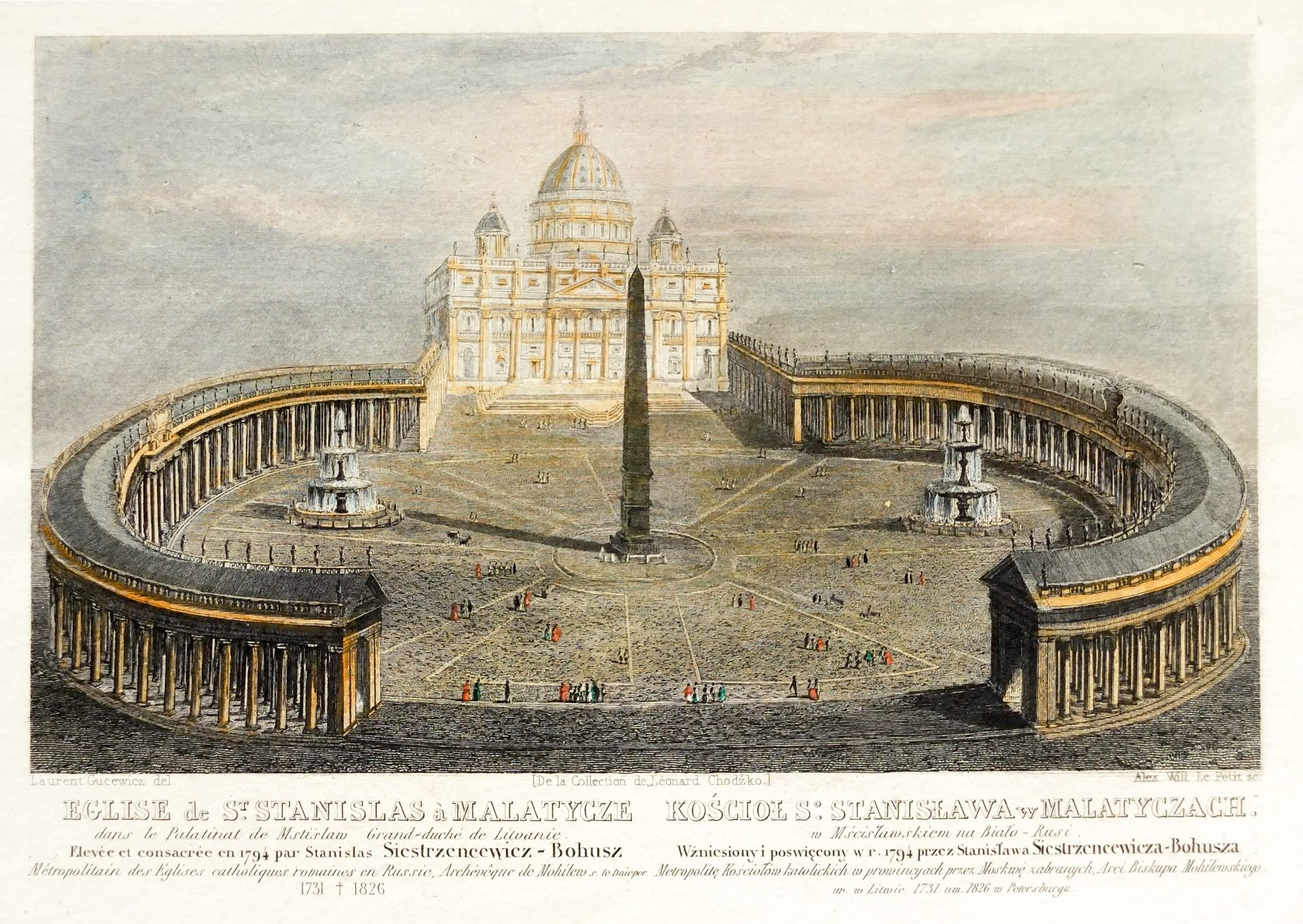
Church of St Stanislas Malatycze (Molyatichi), 1794–1934.
