= Battle of Helsinki (1713) =

Part of the Great Northern War

- Part of the Great Northern War
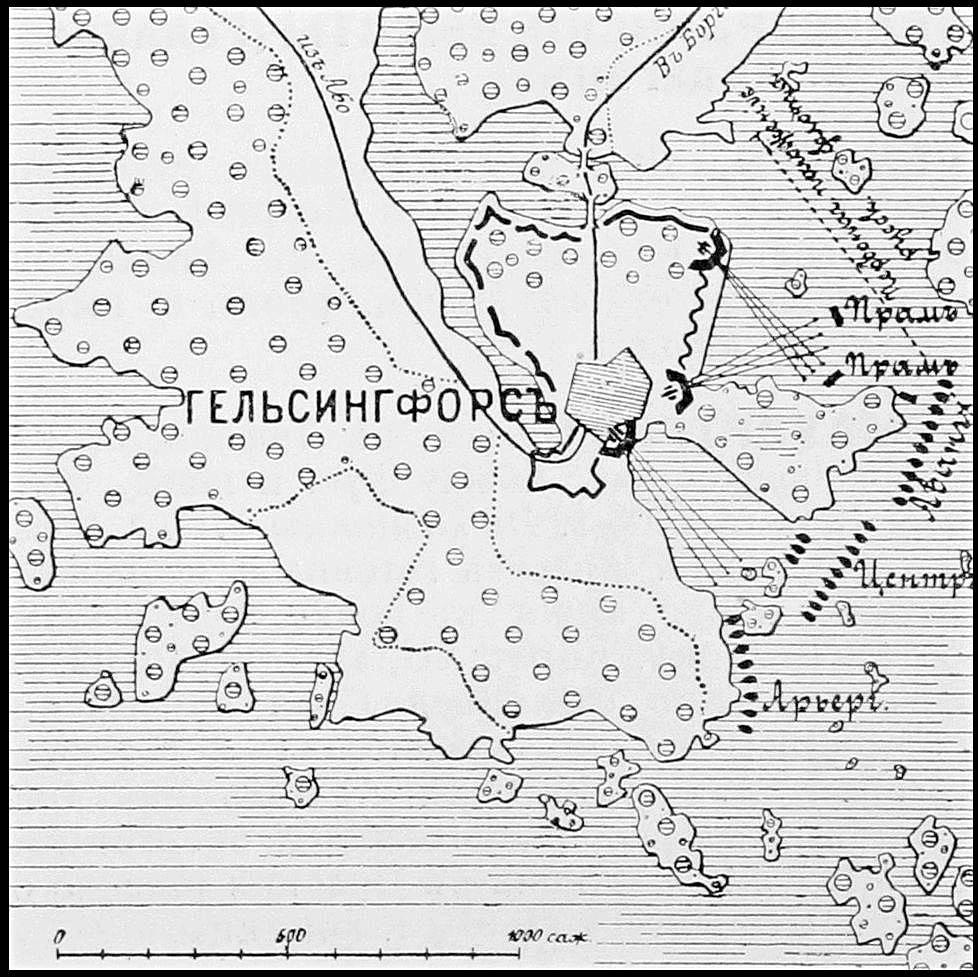
Date	8–11 May 1713
Location	Helsinki, Finland
Result	Russian victory

Belligerents
Swedish Empire	Tsardom of Russia

Commanders and leaders
Carl Gustaf Armfeldt	Peter the Great; Fyodor Apraksin

Strength
1,800	17,000–18,700

Casualties and losses
Minor	At least 70 killed or wounded

The Battle of Helsinki (Russian: Битва на реке Хельсинки) was fought between the Russian army under Tsar Peter the Great and Admiral Fyodor Apraksin and the defending Finnish army of Sweden under General Carl Gustaf Armfeldt between 8 and 11 May 1713, as part of the Great Northern War. It resulted in a Russian victory, leading to the Swedes commanded by Armfelt burning the entire city of Helsinki when retreating. Destroyed after the actual battle, the city changed hands twice more in the following months until it remained permanently in the hands of the Russians.

== Background ==
After the Swedish main army commanded by King Charles XII was destroyed in the Battle of Poltava in 1709, Finland was exposed to Russian attack. An attack on Uusimaa was expected from the fall of Vyborg in the summer of 1710. Helsinki had become an important military base for Sweden during the war, but the city had not been fortified except for modest earth ramparts. The Russian Navy had visited Porvoo with a surprise attack already in 1708. The plight of Helsinki had been deepened by the plague outbreak in the fall of 1710, which killed the majority of the city's inhabitants.

After the death of Carl Nieroth in January 1712, Governor Georg Lybecker, who had already been removed from the same position once due to the loss of Vyborg, was returned as commander-in-chief of the Swedish forces in Finland. The Russian archipelago fleet commanded by Ivan Botsin threatened Helsinki in September 1712, but had to retreat when the Swedish fleet hit the spot. The Neva squadron, which was part of the Swedish fleet, was superior in the open sea, but could not move in the shallow waters of the coast, so the Russian galley fleet controlled the coastal waters of Eastern Uusimaa. However, the Neva squadron, commanded by Admiral Olof Wernfelt and later Admiral Erik Johan Lillie, sailed to its navy base at Karlskrona ahead of the winter freeze of 1712–1713.

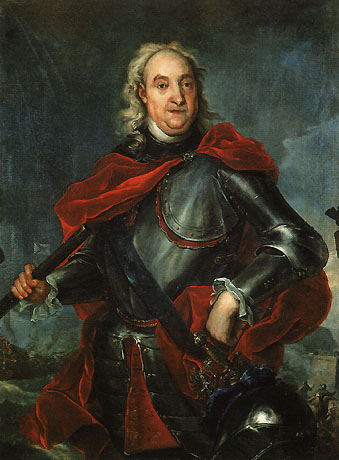
Russian admiral Fyodor Apraksin

After securing peace with the Ottoman Empire in the south, Russian tsar Peter the Great finally decided in 1713 to attack Finland in order to force Sweden to peace in a war that had been going on for 13 years. As soon as the Gulf of Finland was freed from the ice, a fleet of more than 200 light ships (including 110 landing crafts, 93 light galleys, and at least two gun prams and one mortar galliot), commanded by Admiral Fyodor Apraksin, set off from the Kotlin Island, accompanied by 17,000 infantry soldiers, or 18,700 men in total. The first target was Helsinki, from which St. Petersburg wanted a supply center for the Russian army for operations extending deeper into Finland. The Tsar himself sailed with the fleet.

== Battle ==
Apraksin's galley fleet arrived in front of Helsinki shortly after the departure of the ice on 8 May 1713, conveniently before the return of the Neva squadron from Karlskrona, when the city was unprotected from the sea. Since Commander-in-Chief Lybecker did not know where the Russians would try to land, he had spread his forces along the coast of Uusimaa and remained at his headquarters in the Sarvilahti Manor in Pernå. In Helsinki, the commander of the Nyland Regiment of Foot, Major General Carl Gustaf Armfelt, only had 1,800 men at his disposal, of which 1,500 were fit for battle, so the Russians had a huge superiority.

In addition to his own regiment, Armfelt's troops consisted of Uusimaa's cavalry, individual units of other infantry regiments in Finland, and Major Gyllenström's battalion, which arrived as reinforcements. Helsinki was protected by a few artillery batteries. The Russians' first attempt to take over directly from the sea was repelled and they spent the next day assembling their fleet, as the wind temporarily prevented them from landing. In the main attack that began on 10 May, the city's defenders were quickly overwhelmed, as the Russians now landed both at Katajanokka and Hietalahti and shelled the city with cannon fire from several directions.

On the night between 10 and 11 May, Major General Carl Gustaf Armfelt, Nyland and Tavastehus County Governor Johan Creutz, Helsinki Mayor Henrik Tammelin and the wealthy merchant Johan Henrik Frisius, who was responsible for the maintenance of the army, decided in a meeting that defending the city was hopeless and the only option would be to retreat to the north. Charles XII had ordered the army to follow the scorched earth tactic in Finland, so when the Swedes left, they set fire to the entire city and also burned the Crown's grain stores in Katajanokka with their contents. While retreating, Armfelt's army also burned the long bridge on Siltasaari, but the Russians crossed the strait on rafts to continue the pursuit. There was a small skirmish in the old town, where the Swedes failed to stop the Russian advance. Armfelt's troops then encountered the Häme Regiment sent by Lybecker as an auxiliary force and they retreated together to the east to Porvoo.

Peter the Great disembarked in the burning Helsinki during the day of 11 May. At first he ordered the Russians to put out the fire, but after finding the attempt hopeless, he ordered the rest of the buildings to be destroyed. Only the merchant Burgman's house and the church belfry were saved from the fire. The Tsar's plan to use Helsinki as a supply center had failed because the city was in ashes, and he left the same day. The next day, the Swedish Neva squadron arrived, causing the Russians to retreat without a fight. If Helsinki's defense had lasted a day longer, the arrival of reinforcements would probably have turned Russia's victory into a crushing defeat. There was little joy for either side in the now-destroyed city.

== Aftermath ==
Subsequently, to the Russian departure, the Swedes captured a colonel who stated a loss of 70 Russians on 10–11 May; it is uncertain if this figure includes the whole fleet or not. The Swedish casualties were likewise minor. At the end of May, Peter the Great returned to his capital St. Petersburg, but Apraksin still had orders to conquer Finland. When the Russians arrived from the direction of Helsinki, Lybecker had initially retreated inland to Lammi, when Apraksin made contact with the Russian forces east of the Kymi River and thus took control of the entire coast east of Porvoo. In July 1713, Lybecker marched his army back to Porvoo, but Apraksin's infantry slipped past him and on 15 July captured Helsinki again, this time by land from the north, as the ruins of the city were now defended on land by only 200 men. In this situation, the Neva squadron also withdrew from Helsinki, leaving it permanently to the Russians. Apraksin built a Russian base and fortress on the ruins of Helsinki, from where he carried out his next operations in Finland. The inhabitants did not return to the city until eight years later, after the end of the Great Wrath.

== See also ==
- Finland under Swedish rule
- Great Northern War in Finland

== Sources ==
- Aalto, Seppo (2015). Kruununkaupunki – Vironniemen Helsinki 1640–1721 (in Finnish). Helsinki: Finnish Literature Society. ISBN 978-952-222-675-4.
- Hornborg, Eirik (1953). Karolinen Armfelt och kampen om Finland under Stora nordiska kriget (in Swedish). Stockholm: Norstedt. OCLC 14110565.
