= Carl Gustaf Armfeldt =

Swedish officer

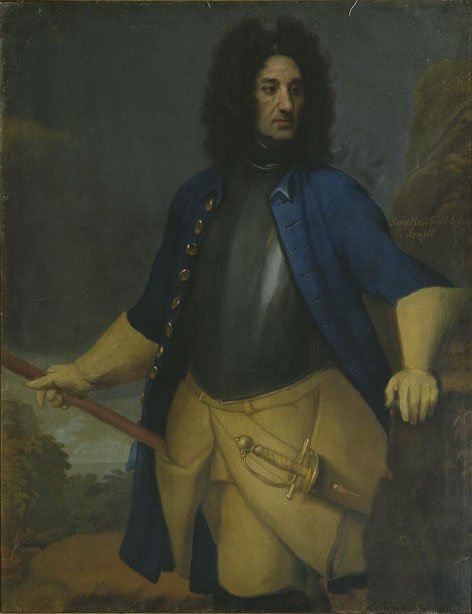
- Portrait by David von Krafft
- Born: 9 November 1666; Swedish Ingria
- Died: 24 October 1736 (aged 69) Liljendal, Nyland, Kingdom of Sweden (now Finland)
- Allegiance: Swedish Empire
- Rank: General
- Commands: Swedish Army
- Conflicts: Great Northern War; Battle of Systerbäck; Battle of Koporye; Battle of Helsinki; Battle of Pälkäne; Battle of Storkyro; Siege of Fredriksten

Carl Gustaf Armfeldt (Note: The surname Armfeldt is also found in the literature by the variant Armfelt.) (9 November 1666 – 24 October 1736) was a Swedish officer, general and friherre (baron) who took part in the Great Northern War.

== Early life ==
Carl Gustaf Armfeldt was born in Swedish Ingria to lieutenant colonel Gustaf Armfelt and Anna Elisabet Brakel. Like other members of his family, Armfelt devoted himself to war and at seventeen years' age joined Nylands kavalleri as a cadet. In 1685, he left this position and left for France where he joined prince Ferdinand of Fürstenberg's regiment as a mere footsoldier. He campaigned in France for twelve years and returned to Sweden as a captain.

== Great Northern War ==
Due to his military experience, he was employed in the Finnish army as a generaladjutant in 1701 and stayed with this army for most of the Great Northern War. He was named commander of the Finnish army in 1713.

During the long war, he distinguished himself in several occasions, especially during the defense of Helsingfors in 1713, but met an overwhelming Russian force and was defeated at the battle of Storkyro in 1714.

=== 1718 Norwegian Campaign ===
In 1717, Armfeldt was promoted to lieutenant general and commanded the Swedish force which on the orders of Charles XII of Sweden was sent into Norway to take Trondheim. Poorly equipped, Armfelt pulled out after the king fell at Fredriksten.

The ensuing disaster that struck his army is known as the Carolean Death March. On New Year's Eve 1718, he arrived at Norwegian Tydalen, with 80 kilometers to the closest Swedish village in Jämtland. When the troops had marched 10 kilometers from Tydalen, a severe blizzard struck from the northwest. The bitter cold killed the guide on the very first day, and the army wandered blindly in the mountains (Sylan mountain range). On the following nights, hundreds more perished. Of the over 5,000 men who left Tydalen, only 2,100 were found alive on arrival at Duved.

== Later life ==
In 1719, Armfelt was named governor of Viborg county but never took office, as the county was under Russian control and was ceded to Russia after the treaty of Nystad. He was elevated to friherre on 5 July 1731 and named general of infantry in 1735. According to the Pernå parish records (cited by Hornborg, 1952) he died at Liljendal in Nyland on 24 October 1736, and was interred at Isnäs on 3 December 1736.

He was married in 1700 to Lovisa Aminoff (1685–1741), daughter of cavalry captain Johan Fredrik Aminoff. Count Gustaf Mauritz Armfelt and baron August Philip Armfelt were his great grandsons.

== See also ==
- Armfelt family
