= Siege of Viborg (1710) =

Siege during the Great Northern War

Coordinates: 60.7092°N 28.7442°E

- Part of the Great Northern War
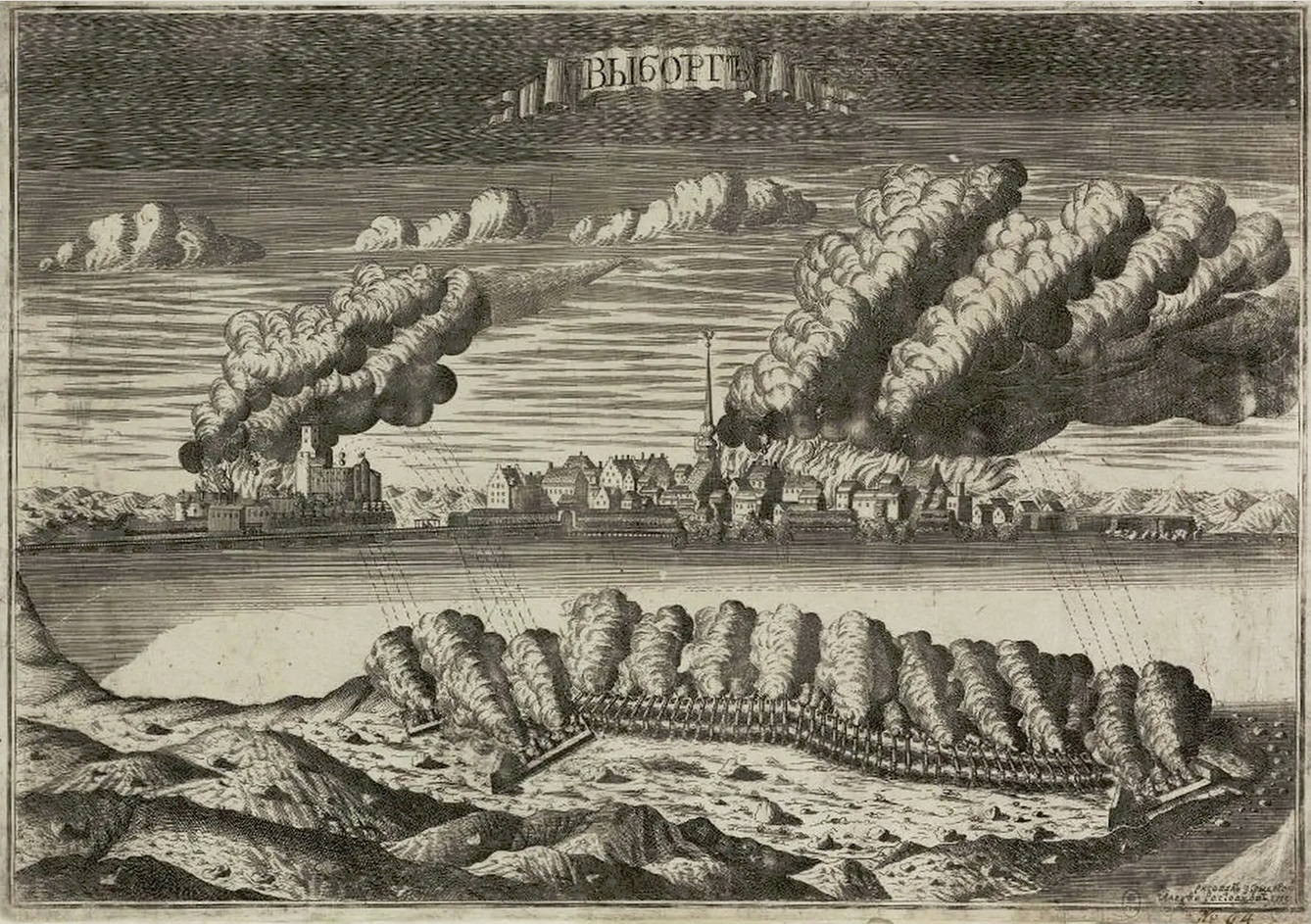
- A view of the siege on 13 June 1710, Alexei Rostovtsev
| Date | March 1710 – 12 June 1710 (O.S.) |
| Location | Viborg, Viborg and Nyslott County |
| Result | Russian victory |

Belligerents
| Russia; Navy | Sweden |

Commanders and leaders
| Peter I Fyodor Apraksin | Magnus Stiernstråle (surrendered) |

Strength
| 22–24,000 | 6,000 |

Casualties and losses
| 1,800 killed | 2,500 killed 3,880 captives |

The siege of Viborg took place in the spring of 1710 during the Great Northern War (1700–1721), as a second attempt by the Russians to capture the fortress port of Viborg (today Vyborg), near the modern border between Russia and Finland, after a failed attempt in 1706. After the outbreak of the war, Swedish forces had fortified themselves in the port of Viborg. In order to assure safety for the newly founded city of Saint Petersburg, Peter the Great ordered the Swedish fort to be secured. A first unsuccessful attempt was made in 1706. Later plans were put on hold because of other ongoing conflicts but, after the Russian success at the Battle of Poltava in June 1709, the men and resources were available to capture the town.

Thirteen thousand troops under General-Admiral Fyodor Apraksin marched to Viborg and laid siege on 22 March 1710. Magnus Stiernstråle, the Swedish commander at the fort, waited in vain for Swedish assistance, while a stalemate ensued because the Russians lacked sufficient artillery. In April, Peter the Great managed to bring through a fleet of 250 ships to deliver guns and supplies, and to help perform a final assault on Swedish positions. After these Russian attacks, the Swedish garrison surrendered on 12 June 1710.

== Background ==
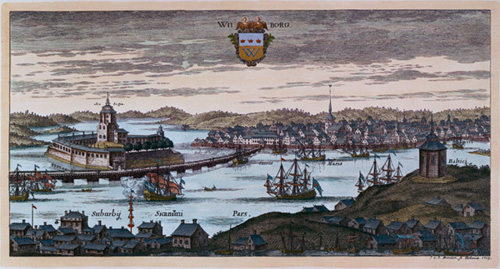
A 1709 engraving, showing the Schloss (castle) on the left

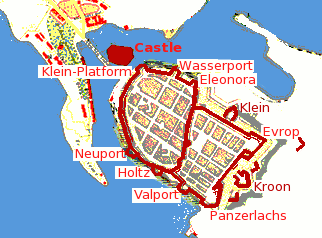
The fortifications at Viborg before the siege

After the victory at the Battle of Poltava, the Russian army was able to proceed with further offensive actions in the northwestern theater of operations. In 1710, the Russian army undertook an offensive in two directions: on the Baltic coast (where, in the fall in 1710, Riga was besieged) and in Finland, with attacks on Viborg and Kexholm. The selection of the command staff destined for the siege of Viborg led to the main authority being given to General-Admiral Fyodor Apraksin, while his subordinates were Major-Generals Robert Bruce and Wilhelm Bergholtz. Before the siege, Bruce and Bergholtz had operated mainly in defensive roles, chiefly in the defense of Saint Petersburg. They would later lead the offensive into Finland. They were chosen because, at that time, the commanders most experienced in siege warfare (including Boris Sheremetev, Jacob Bruce, and Anikita Repnin) were concentrated around Riga. Consequently, it was considered a possibility that Peter the Great himself would command forces at Viborg, so that he would not have to reassign the experienced generals and thus jeopardize the attacks on Riga.

=== Fortifications at Viborg ===
In 1709, the main fort at Viborg consisted of five frontal bastions named Holtz, Neuport, Klein-Platform, Wasserport and Eleonora, connected by the Viborg town wall, in the eastern section of the town. The western part of the town, connected to the main section, had three bastions named Valport, Pansarlax, and Europa. To the west of the wall between Pansarlax and Europa, there was a ravelin and two caponiers, and to the west of the wall between Evrop and Eleonora was another ravelin. Both ravelins were, apparently, earthen, but inside the main eastern fort, all structures were stone. Most of the structures in the western part of the fort were wooden, with the exception of the stone guard tower, named the Petersburg tower. Separate from these fortifications, on the small central island west of the town (now the Zamkovy Island, Russian: Замковый), was Viborg Castle, which stands to this day. The fort had 151 guns at its defense.

By this time, the fortifications had fallen into disrepair because the Swedish command did not pay much attention to these territories, and funds that were allotted for renovation were insignificant. In addition, the forts at Nöteborg and Nyenskans were considered sufficient to provide defense for the region. In 1702, however, some repairs were completed under the supervision of Captain L. Stobecks.

According to Yuri Moshnik, a modern historian, the garrison at Viborg in 1710 stood at 6000 men; other modern historians B. Adamovich and A. I. Dubravin put the number at 4000. Since 1702, the commander there had been Zacharias Animoff, who was old and in poor health. For that reason, in February 1710, Colonel Magnus Stiernstråle officially replaced him; he had de facto headed the efforts to fortify the city.

=== Previous attempts ===
Russia had made a previous attempt to capture Viborg; in October 1706, a siege corps was sent there under the command of Robert (Roman) Bruce. On 22 October, mortars were placed and the bombardment began, which continued for four days and caused five fires in the fort at Viborg. After the bombardment, Russian forces retreated to Saint Petersburg after commanders realized that a siege could not be carried out without naval support and larger cannon. Also, autumn was not considered a suitable time for siege operations. The idea to reattempt a capture of Viborg was first proposed by Peter the Great in 1708, but rejected by the military due to the recent Swedish offensive.

== Russian attack ==
Peter's plan for the second siege of Viborg involved a combination of land and sea forces, and the fort was to be taken by a prolonged siege. By February 1710, a specialized siege corps had been assembled on Kotlin Island. This time, the Russian attack came in two stages. On 2 March 1710, General Apraksin received orders to attack Viborg, and he planned to move out by 15 March. However, on 16 March, he was still on Kotlin Island, from where he wrote to Robert Bruce that he was departing on "the day of tomorrow". In fact, he only set out on 21 March, arriving with the cavalry on that same day at Viborg; the infantry and cannon arrived the next day.

=== Russian forces arrive ===
When the siege corps arrived at Viborg on the 22nd, they occupied the town's outskirts and countryside, forcing the Swedes to regroup behind the town's inner stone wall. The Swedes had attempted to burn down the part of the town outside of the stone walls to prevent it from falling into Russian hands, but failed to do so before they were driven into their fortifications. On that same day, as Apraksin reported to the czar:

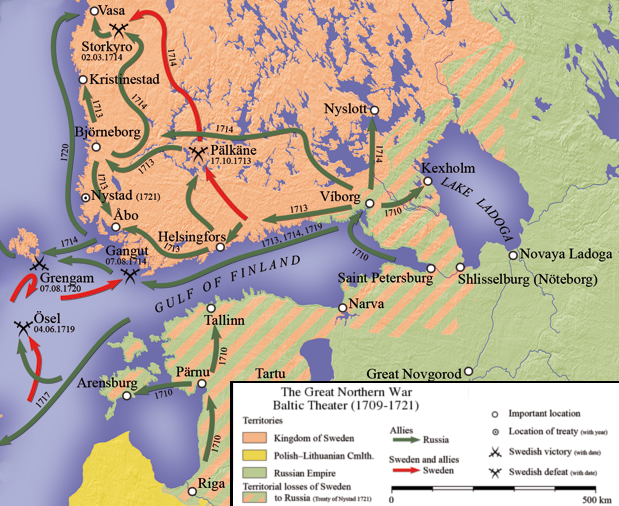
The Baltic theater of the Great Northern War, 1709–1721

"We neared the fort itself in approaches, which took a great effort, since at that time there was great cold, and in addition to that the situation around the fort is rocky, which caused significant upturn; however, despite the difficulty, the approaches have brought us to the sea strait, which is right under the city itself, at the distance of a musket's shot, with which bags full of fur were very helpful, where there were bare rocks. And for the other side ... to perform the approaches, Major-General Bergholtz was sent out with six regiments, which were also nearing the city with approaches."

These advances took place under Swedish artillery fire. From 21 March until 29 March (when, according to Aleksander Myshlayevsky, the Russians began firing their artillery), 66 bombs and 1,200 round shots were released by Swedish artillery. Also, the Swedes attempted a ground assault, but were driven back into the fort.

==== Number of artillery pieces ====
Estimates of the number of artillery pieces taken to Viborg differ widely according to the various sources. In most sources, including Journal ... of Emperor Peter the Great from 1698 to the Treaty of Nystad, "Report on the capture of Viborg", "The Life and Affairs of the Great Sovereign", and The Viborg Fortress: Chronicles from 1710 to 1872, it is said that there were ten 12-pounder guns and three mortars. N. G. Ustryalov believed that there were ten 12-pounders and five mortars, M. M. Borodkin counted 24 cannon and four mortars, and M. V. Vasiliev 12 cannon and four mortars, although none of these historians give their sources for their figures. A letter from Fyodor Apraksin to Peter the Great dated 2 April 1710 stated that "the enemy has constructed three batteries against us; they shoot powerfully and accurately: one of our cannon, they have broken, another blew up from frequent firing; we have, remaining, 10 cannon in our batteries." (This was the only recorded time during the siege when Swedish artillery managed to disable Russian equipment.) Thus, Myshlaevsky concluded that there were originally 12 cannon brought to Viborg, but only ten of them were used in the siege, as two of them were disabled. There were probably three mortars, although there are no primary sources to validate this.

In any case, there was not enough artillery, but new pieces could not be brought in. This was because it was very difficult to move them over land, and there was not enough ice to bring them over the sea.

=== Initial bombardment ===
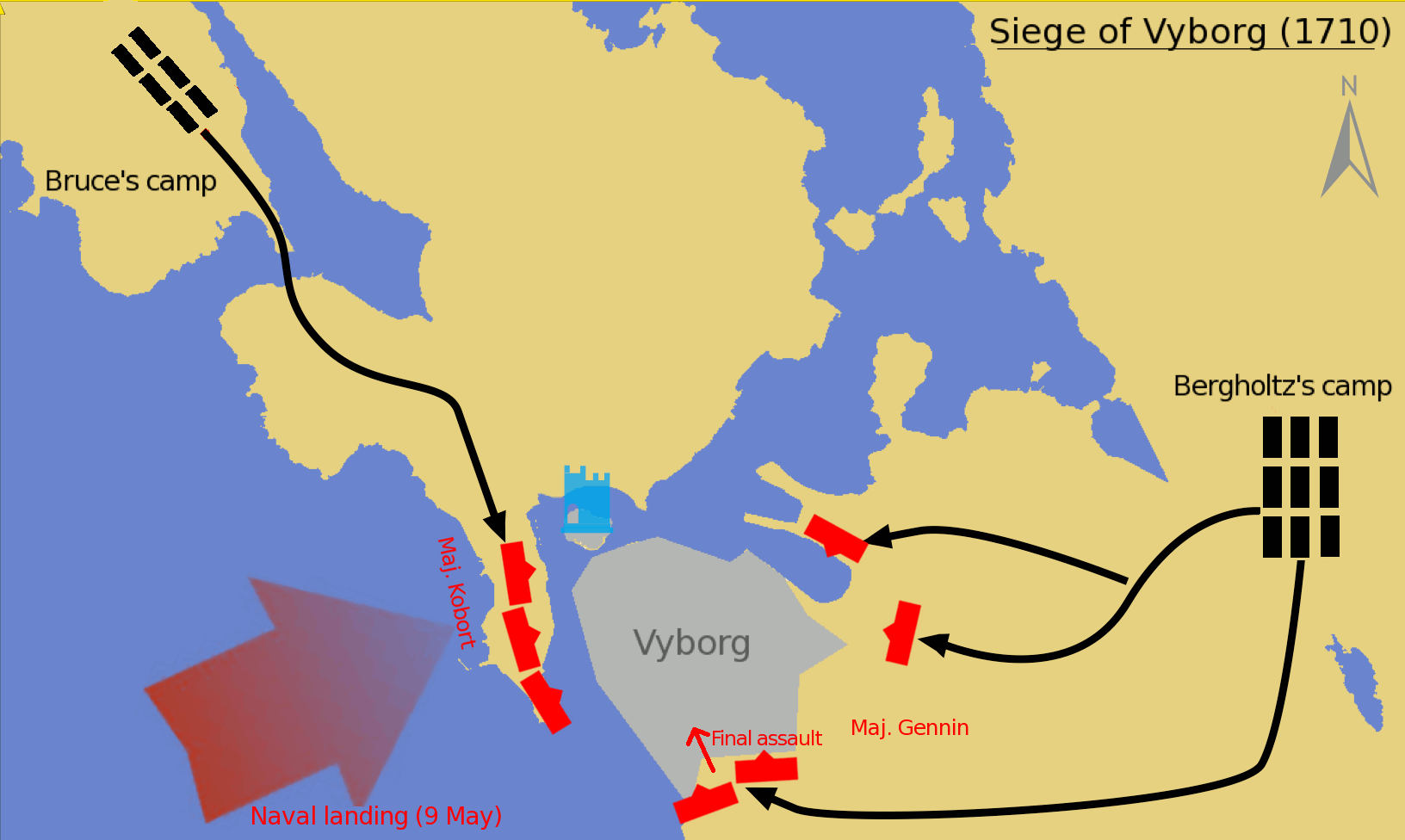
Russian troop movements and battery positions

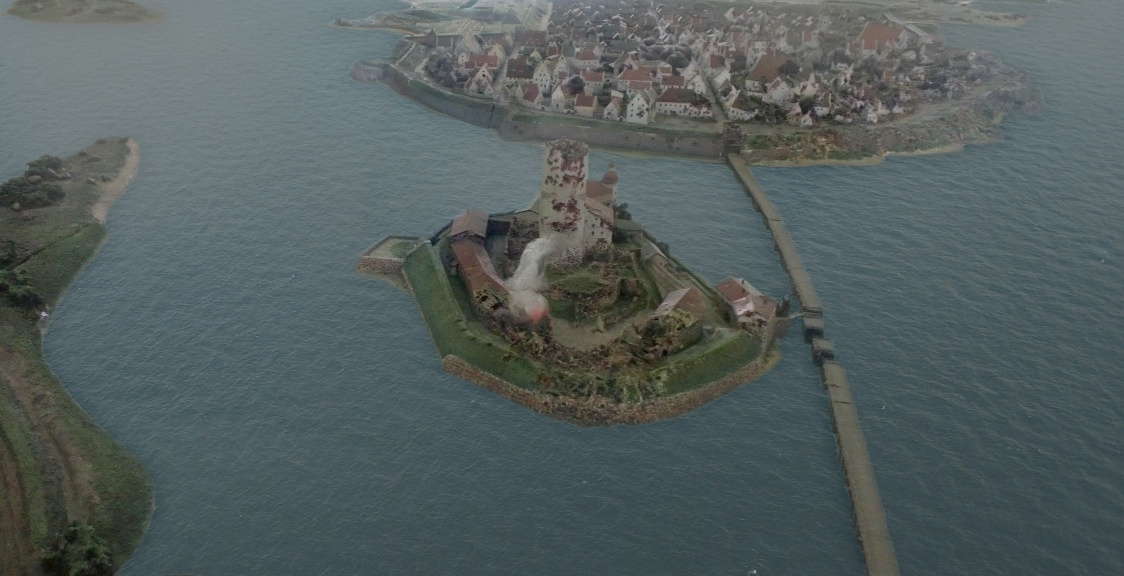
A digital recreation of the Viborg castle ablaze after the Russian attack on the city in 1710

It is not certain on what day the Russians began shelling the fort. Based on reports by Apraksin to Peter and on Peter the Great's journal, Russian artillery opened fire on 1 April. However, Apraksin reported to the czar that he "began bombarding Viborg and the castle on 30 March, and on the first day 130 bombs were planted, and 90 on the second." Furthermore, Aleksander Myshlayevsky published a "List of how many shots were fired from mortars and cannon at Viborg from 21 March to 9 April, and how many of them hit the city." There, it claims that shelling began on 29 March, when 150 mortar shots and 60 cannon shots were fired. It continues, saying that during the next three days only the mortars were used, firing 100 shots per day. In total, during the first period of the siege, the attackers fired 2,975 shots from mortars and 1,531 from cannon, and the Swedes fired 399 mortar shots and 7,464 cannon shots; thus the Swedish fire outweighed the Russian fire. On 5 April, Apraksin noted that "our cannon are doing little to help us, for they are rather small and light; when we begin firing, the opponent shoots one out of ten." However, the mortars inflicted great damage upon Viborg and the fort, forcing citizens to find cover in cellars. Despite this, soldiers had to remain positioned on the mounds, and suffered heavy casualties.

Soon, Major-Generals Bruce and Bergholtz turned to Apraksin with a proposal to assault the fort, not waiting for "the production of an opening". Their reasoning was that they could end up losing more soldiers from injuries and disease than they would during an assault. Peter, having found out about this from a letter by Apraksin, decided it to be "very significant, but also very dangerous." In the end he left the decision up to General Apraksin who, not wanting to bear the responsibility for a failure, decided to wait for reinforcements to arrive by sea once the ice had opened up.

Small Swedish garrison placed their hopes on the support from the Royal Swedish Navy which was bound to arrive once the ice opened up. Russians on the other had were also running low on food and ammunition and with roads between Viborg and Saint Petersburg ruined by thaw only route for their support and supplies to arrive was also via sea route. With neither side able to make headway both sides waiting for their respective naval force. The side whose naval forces arrived first would have decisive advantage in the siege.

=== Reinforcements arrive ===
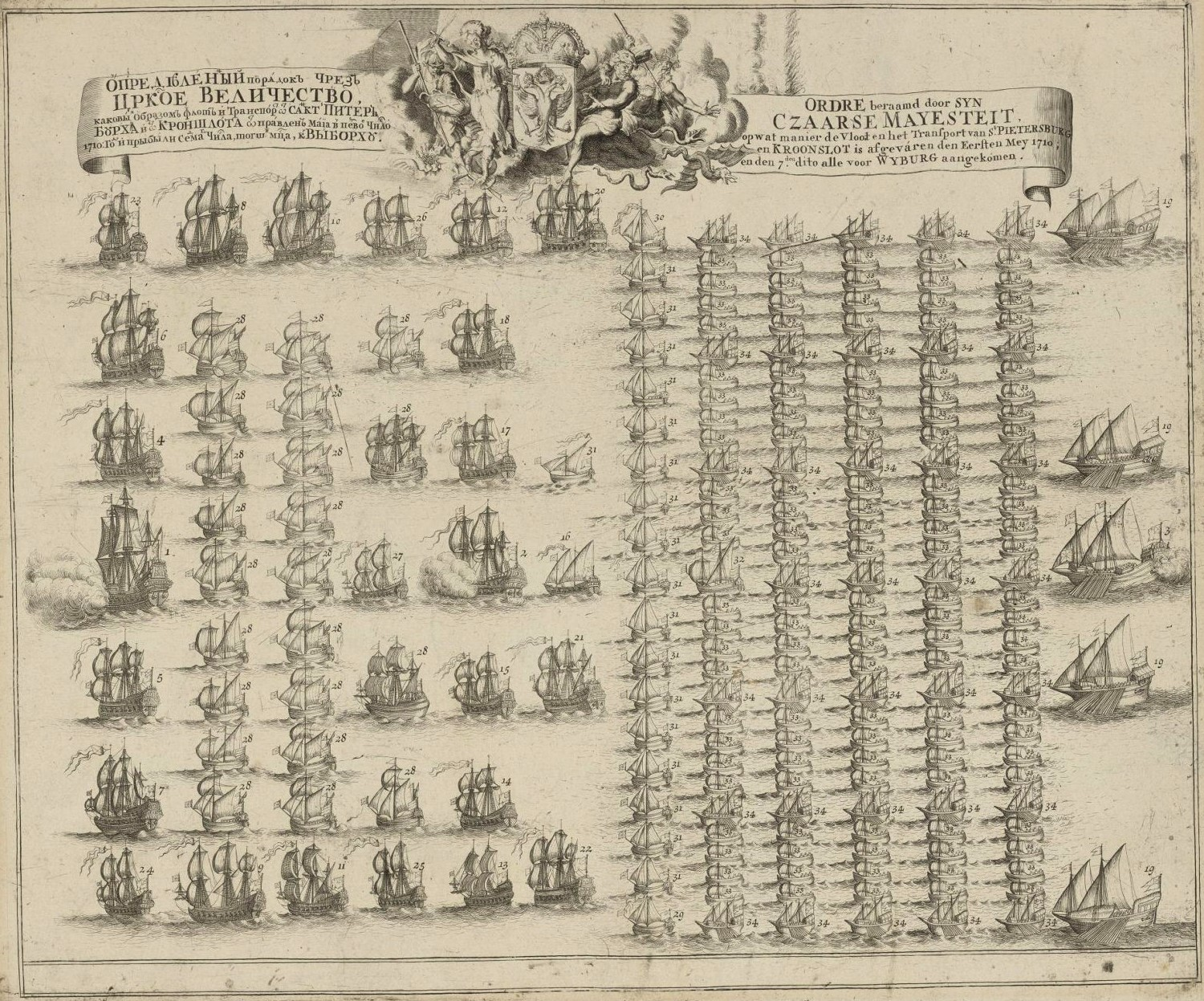
A contemporary illustration of the Russian fleet that arrived at Viborg

Meanwhile, in Saint Petersburg, preparations were already underway for an amphibious attack on Viborg. The tools needed for the siege were taken from the Peter and Paul Fortress. On 4 April, Cyril Naryshkin, the first Commandant of Saint Petersburg, received orders for twenty 18-pounder guns to be sent to Viborg from Narva (through Saint Petersburg), "by land or by sea, whichever path is more convenient," and 9,000 cannonballs along with them. However, Naryshkin could not gather the artillery fast enough, and only on 25 April did he send the cannon to Kotlin Island, where Captain Solovoy received them.

Peter did not wait for the cannon and, on 30 April, set out with his fleet to sea. He could not postpone his sailing due to a shortage of ammunition and provisions at Viborg. Because the ice had not completely melted, the trip to Viborg was very difficult. When the ice was particularly thick, crews had to resort to "hauling a small cannon onto the bowsprit and dropping it onto the ice" to break it. Many provision transport ships were driven off course by winds or ice, and they were barely rescued. When Peter's fleet finally arrived on 9 May, the Russian troops had only three days of provisions left. Russian forces also formed defenses to Trångsund (ru: Vysotsk, fi: Uuras) to blockade the town from sea.

Swedish squadron consisting of seven ships of the line and three frigates and their assorted support ships under Admiral Gustav Wattrang had been delayed by the easterly winds arrived only after the Russian fleet had already left back for Saint Petersburg. Since they were unable to approach the town due to Russian defenses the Swedish squadron chose to arrange blockade of their own outside of Trångsund to trap the few Russian ships left behind. However, due to the late arrival of the squadron the town had in effect already been lost and its surrender was only matter of time.

Upon arriving at Viborg, Peter immediately inspected Swedish fortifications and devised "Instructions on preparations for an assault on Viborg". In it were plans for constructing two cannon batteries and three mortar batteries, with a total of 60 cannon and 18 mortars directed toward the Viborg fort. It was also ordered that 140 light mortars be placed to knock enemy troops from walls during a final assault and to perform nighttime bombardments. Peter noted that that left 20 cannon, ten mortars and 50 light mortars in reserve, which could be used during a full barrage of the fort. He also proposed using fire ships from the sea, although they were never used.

Construction on the batteries mentioned in Peter's "Instructions" began on 17 May, and some of them were finished by 24 May. The Viborg Fortress: Chronicles from 1710 to 1872 mentions that during the construction, a truce-bearer was sent out from the Viborg fort with a request to Russian forces to allow passage for a courier to deliver letters to the Swedish general Georg Lybecker, but the request was denied. There are also records that show a Swedish fleet arriving at Viborg and being beaten back by the Russians. However, other sources do not mention the truce-bearer or the naval battle; Fyodor Apraksin even wrote to the czar saying that he "could not imagine" how a Swedish fleet could be sent to Viborg, although he did take precautions. During this time, Ivan Botsis was sent out with a fleet of galleys to block access to the bay, thus completely blockading the town and fort of Viborg.

=== Final barrage and Swedish surrender ===
In a letter on 29 May, Fyodor Apraksin noted that work on the artillery batteries on his side of Viborg were finished, and that there was still progress to be made toward completing the batteries on Bergholtz's side (although ten mortars were already in place), because of "great swamps and rocky [soil]". He asked Peter whether to wait for Bergholtz to finish building his batteries or proceed in the barrage without him; Apraksin himself was leaning toward the latter option, because he did not want to lose time and supplies, and because that side of the fortress was too heavily fortified for Bergholtz's guns. The czar agreed that there was no reason to wait, and ordered that the bombardment start as soon as possible. However, this led to another problem: it was impossible to quietly transport artillery over the rocky soil. There was also more daylight by that time of the year, and due to Viborg's location in the northern latitudes, the sun only set around 9:00 pm. This meant that twilight lasted almost all night, and Swedish defensive fire could continue for longer, inflicting further casualties.

Nevertheless, the second barrage of the fort began on 1 June; by then, Bergholtz had 13 additional cannon at his disposal. The barrage lasted until 6 June, as a result of which "there was made a great breach, that two battalions were lined up on either side to take the city". During those six days, there were a total of 2,975 mortar shots and 1,539 from cannon. The Swedish fired 7,464 shots from cannon and 394 from mortars. Both the first and second barrages had a similar number of shots fired, but the second barrage was a lot more devastating to the Swedish. This was due to several factors; the shots fired during the second bombardment used higher-caliber ammunition and did greater damage per round, and the rate of fire was much more intense. The first bombardment took a month, whereas the second only took six days.

On 6 June, the decision was made to make a final assault on the fort. The next two days were spent in preparation, and those who would lead the "storm" were already chosen. However, on 9 June, the Swedish side sent out another truce-bearer, who said they were ready to surrender. On 13 June, the garrison at Viborg officially surrendered before any direct assault took place. The surrendered Swedish garrison numbered 3,880 men, including 156 officers and 3,274 soldiers of lower rank. Swedish losses were estimated at around 2,500. Contrary to what had been agreed in surrender documents Russians took all the healthy men left in the garrison when it surrendered as prisoners while 877 wounded men as well as 169 women and group of children were transported to Helsinki aboard the ships of Admiral Wattrang.

== Aftermath ==
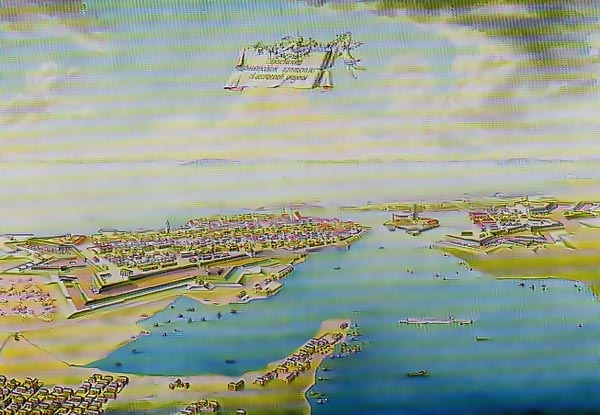
Vyborg in the late 1700s, after being refortified by the Russians

In his letters announcing the capture of Viborg, Peter the Great wrote that from now on the "final security of Saint Petersburg has been achieved." The czar said that Viborg should become a "firm cushion" to the new capital. By capturing Viborg, several important strategic goals were achieved. The Russian Empire now had vastly improved access to the Baltic Sea, from which they could launch further attacks against Finland, and a powerful fort that would defend the new capital of Saint Petersburg. The czar ordered the fort to be renovated with the help of a special army division and local peasants.

The new Swedish Governor-General of Finland, Carl Nieroth, led an attempt to recapture the town with an army of 10,000 men with naval support. In the spring of 1711, Swedish light infantry had already started harassing operations, and a naval blockade had been place for most of the summer. Swedish manpower had been sapped by a plague which had struck Finland in late 1710, delaying all Swedish land and naval operations. In the autumn of 1711, Swedish land forces were able to begin a siege, but were unsuccessful due to a lack of supplies. On 2 December 1711, freezing waters and harsh weather forced the naval squadron to retreat, while the land forces persisted until 25 December. Governor-General Nieroth, who had invigorated Swedish operations in Finland, died suddenly on 25 January 1712, and was succeeded by weak Georg Henrik Lybecker.

=== Strategic significance ===
With the loss of Viborg, the Swedes lost an important naval and land base, and their activities in the Gulf of Finland were restricted. Russia's occupation of Viborg allowed the creation of a base to supply troops and build ships, and expanded the zone of action of the Baltic Fleet. Viborg demonstrated this importance as a key military base from 1712 to 1714, when full-scale Russian land operations began in Finland. Thus, in effect, the capture of Viborg and a portion of Karelia served to determine the outcome of the Great Northern War by establishing a staging area for further military actions.

During peace talks with Sweden, the "Viborg question" was debated, and Peter the Great told his representative, Andrey Osterman, to pressure Sweden to cede Viborg and Riga regardless of the situation. Thus, after the Treaty of Nystad, Viborg officially became incorporated into the Russian Empire as Vyborg. This began a new period in the city's multinational history, where Russian influences would mix with the city's Swedish, Finnish, and German culture.
