= Fyodor Apraksin =

Russian admiral (1661–1728)

Count Fyodor Matveyevich Apraksin
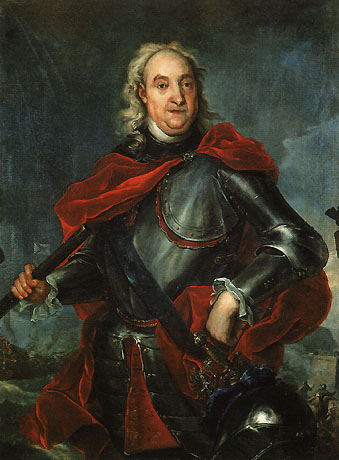
- Apraksin by Johann Gottfried Tannauer
- Born: 7 December 1661
- Died: 21 November 1728 (aged 66)
- Military career
- Allegiance: Russia
- Rank: General admiral
- Conflicts: Murat Kuchukov Movement; Battle of Terki; Great Northern War; Battle of the Neva; Evacuation of Kolkanpää; Siege of Viborg; Battle of Gangut; Battle of Helsinki; Battle of Pälkäne; Battle of Stäket; Russo-Persian War (1722–1723)
- Awards: Order of Saint Andrew

President of Admiralty Board
- In office 1717–1728
- Monarchs: Peter I Catherine I Peter II
- Preceded by: office established
- Succeeded by: Peter von Sivers (as vice president)

Count Fyodor Matveyevich Apraksin (also Apraxin; Russian: Фёдор Матве́евич Апра́ксин; 7 December [O.S. 27 November] 1661 – 21 November [O.S. 10 November] 1728, Moscow) was one of the first Russian admirals, governed Estonia and Karelia from 1712 to 1723, was made general admiral (1708), presided over the Russian Admiralty from 1717 to 1728 and commanded the Baltic Fleet from 1723.

== Early shipbuilding activities ==
The Apraksin brothers were launched to prominence after the marriage of their sister Marfa to Tsar Feodor III of Russia in 1681. Fyodor entered the service of his brother-in-law at the age of 10 as a stolnik. After Feodor's death he served the little tsar Peter in the same capacity. He took part in military amusements of the young tsar and helped to build a toy flotilla for him. The playfellowship of the two lads resulted in a lifelong friendship.

In 1692 Apraksin was appointed governor of Arkhangelsk, the foremost trade port of Russia at that time, and built ships capable of weathering storms, to the great delight of the tsar. While living there, he commissioned one of the first Russian trade vessels to be built and sail abroad. In 1697 he was entrusted with major shipbuilding activities in Voronezh, where he would supervise the construction of the first Russian fleet. He won his colonelcy at the siege of Azov (1696). He was nominated the first Russian governor of Azov in 1700. While Peter was combating Charles XII, Apraksin was constructing fleets, building fortresses and havens in South Russia, notably Tavrov and Taganrog. In 1700 he was also appointed chief of the admiralty, in which post (from 1700 to 1706) his unusual technical ability was of great service.

== Great Northern War ==
Having pacified the rebellious Astrakhan, Apraksin was summoned to Moscow, where he was put in charge of the mint and the armoury. In 1707, he was appointed president of the Russian Admiralty. The following year, he was appointed commander-in-chief in Ingria, to defend the new capital Saint Petersburg against the Swedes, whom he utterly routed. On 25 February 1710, aged 48, he became the third Russian ever to be elevated to the comital dignity. In March 1710 he was in command at the Siege of Vyborg. Taking this Swedish fortress in June, he was invested with the Order of St. Andrew and appointed governor of the conquered provinces (Estonia, Ingria, and Karelia).

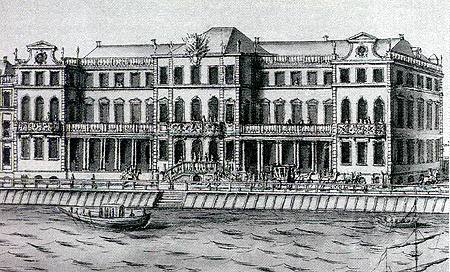
Apraksin Palace in St Petersburg was constructed to a design by Jean-Baptiste Le Blond in 1717–1725. Foreign visitors admitted that "even a king would have been jealous of such a noble dwelling". Several decades later, the palace was demolished to make room for the Winter Palace, which now occupies the spot

Apraksin held the chief command in the Black Sea during the campaign of the Pruth (1711). He commanded the Imperial Russian Navy in the taking of Helsinki (1713)—materially assisting the conquest of Finland by his operations from the side of the sea—and the great Battle of Gangut (1714). That same year he assisted the tsar in opening a new naval harbour in Reval (now Tallinn, Estonia). Earlier, in 1712, he held parley with Ottoman Turkey, which ended in the destruction of Taganrog and the surrender of Azov to the Ottomans.

From 1710 to 1720 he personally conducted the descents upon Sweden, ravaging that country mercilessly, and thus extorting the peace of Nystad, whereby she surrendered the best part of her Baltic provinces to Russia. For these great services he was made a senator and General Admiral of the Empire.

== Later years ==
In 1715, Apraksin fell into temporary disgrace with the tsar, who had been informed about disorders and bribery in the Admiralty. After brief investigation, he was fined and dispatched to govern Estonia. In 1719, he led the Russian naval expedition into the Gulf of Bothnia. During the Russo-Persian War (1722–1723) Apraksin barely escaped an assassination attempt by a Chechen.

Whereas his elder brother Peter Apraksin (the governor of Astrakhan) was accused of sympathizing with the Tsarevich Alexei Petrovich, Fyodor was eager to demonstrate his zeal in persecuting the tsarevich, as did Count Peter Tolstoy (1645–1729).

Upon Peter's I death in 1725, his wife Catherine invested the ailing admiral with the Order of St. Alexander Nevsky and nominated him to the Supreme Privy Council, an exigence of the Great Boyars of Russia headed by an influential member of a powerful family, Prince Dmitry Mikhaylovich Galitzine (1665–1737), Ambassador to Turkey and Poland–Lithuania.

These "Six Supreme dignitaries" constituting the initial Supreme Privy Council, namely Alexander Menshikov, Fyodor Apraksin, Gavrila Golovkin, Andrey Osterman, Peter Tolstoy, and Dmitry Galitzine brought about the recognition of Russian Empress Anna Ivanovna for the succession of the unfortunate boy Tsar Peter II, who died in 1730 aged 15 after only 3 years as a Tsar.

Once Empress Anna Ivanovna was crowned she began to rule absolutely, and she had Galitzine sentenced to death but later commuted his sentence to exile.

Dmitry Galitzine's brother Mikhail Galitzine (1675–1730) commanded Russian operations in Finland (1714–21) during the Northern War with Sweden and was responsible for the Treaty of Nystad, concluded at the end of the war.

Apraksin's last expedition was to Revel in 1726, to cover the town from an anticipated attack by the British government, with whom the relations of Russia at the beginning of the reign of Catherine I were strained.

Though frequently threatened with terrible penalties by Peter the Great for his incurable vice of peculation, Apraksin nevertheless contrived to save his head, though not his pocket, chiefly through the mediation of the good-natured empress, the Swedish-born common-law wife and later formal wife of Peter I, Catherine I, sole ruling Empress of Russia from 1725 to 1727.

She remained his friend to the last, probably because of his helping to place Catherine I on the throne on the death of Peter.

== Legacy ==
According to R. N. Bain, Apraksin was the most genial and kind-hearted of all Peter's pupils. He is said to have never made an enemy. He died on November 10, 1728, aged 67, and was interred in the family sepulchre at the Chrysostom Monastery of Moscow, where his grave was destroyed by the Communists in the 1930s.

== Sources ==
- Robert Nisbet Bain, The Pupils of Peter the Great (London, 1897).
- Vozhzhov, G. A. (2023). "АПРАКСИН ФЁДОР МАТВЕЕВИЧ". Great Russian Encyclopedia. Electronic version.
