= Evacuation of Kolkanpää =

Evacuation (1708) during the Great Northern War

Battle of Kolkanpää
- Part of the Great Northern War
Date	16 October 1708 (O.S.); 17 October 1708 (Swedish calendar); 27 October 1708 (N.S.)
Location	Kolkanpää, Swedish Empire, present-day Russia
Result	Russian victory

Belligerents
(yes) Swedish Empire	Tsardom of Russia

Commanders and leaders
(Swedish Empire) Henrik Mattias von Seulenberg	(Tsardom of Russia) Fyodor Apraksin

Strength
600–800 men	3,000–3,500 men

Casualties and losses
600–800 killed, wounded and captured	50 killed, 220 wounded

The Evacuation of Kolkanpää took place between on 27 October 1708 (N.S.), close to Kolkanpää, in the Swedish Empire during the Great Northern War. The Swedes under the command of Georg Lybecker were evacuating their Finnish-based army consisting of up to 11,279 men back to Finland after their failed campaign in Swedish Ingria in an attempt to recover land previously lost to Russia. Fyodor Apraksin, the Russian commander in the area, decided to interrupt the evacuation with between 3,000 and 3,500 men. He decided to wait until only a portion, between 600 and 800 Saxon ex-prisoners recruited into Swedish service, remained on the beaches not yet evacuated before commencing attack with all his troops. After several assaults the Saxons were soon overwhelmed and almost all of them were cut down or captured by the end of the battle. About 50 Russians were killed and 220 wounded. The Swedes were also forced to slaughter about 4,000 of their horses which could not be evacuated so they would not fall into Russian hands.
