= Georg Lybecker =

George Lybecker
- Died: June 4, 1718; Wärnsta in Närke, Sweden
- Spouse: Susanne Christiane Modée (m. 1689)
- Military career
- Allegiance: Sweden
- Branch: Cavalry
- Service years: 1673–1717
- Rank: Lieutenant-General
- Units: Northern Scania Cavalry Regiment; Life Regiment of Horse
- Conflicts: Scanian War; Battle of Lund; Battle of Landskrona; Great Northern War; Battle of Kliszów; Storming of Lemberg; Battle of Łowicz (1705); Battle of the Neva; Evacuation of Kolkanpää; Battle of Hirvikoksi; Battle of Helsinki

Georg Lybecker was a Swedish friherre and lieutenant general of the Swedish Army, he was son to Georg Henrik Lybecker and Catharina Grissbach. He died on 4 June 1718 at Värsta, Närke (his birth date is unknown).

== Military career ==
After joining the Scanian cavalry regiment he rose to the rank of major in 1703 and lieutenant colonel in 1704. Lybecker participated in Charles XII of Sweden's campaign against Poland during the Great Northern War, notably at the battle of Kliszów in 1702. He was appointed Governor of Viborg and Nyslott County and major general of cavalry in 1706. He became friherre in 1707.

When the commander of the army in Finland General Georg Johan Maidel was dismissed in 1707, Lybecker was appointed as his successor. His task was to protect Finland against Russian attack. This task was difficult since the available defensive forces in Finland were so weak. In 1708 Lybecker led his forces on an expedition into Ingria with the intent to divide Russian forces. The expedition was a failure: Lybecker was forced to evacuate his force by ship at Kolkanpää, abandoning all his cavalry. In 1710, Viborg fell to the Russians without him making any attempt to relieve the city. Lybecker was promoted to Lieutenant General that same year, but the government in Stockholm, dissatisfied with his inactivity, removed him from general command and entrusted the army of Finland to count Carl Gustaf von Nieroth.

After von Nieroth's sudden death in 1712, Lybecker was appointed commander in Finland a second time, but this time proved himself even less worthy of the position. He made no attempt at preventing Russian troops from landing on the southern coast of Finland, nor did he support Carl Gustaf Armfeldt's beleaguered force in Helsinki, nor did he attempt to recover Helsinki after it fell in Russian hands in May 1713. He assembled his main force in Borgå (Porvoo), but when the enemy prepared for a landing there he withdrew further north without firing a shot and afterwards marched aimlessly around while southern Finland was taken.

Lybecker blamed the instructions Charles XII had given him, which forbade him from committing to a major battle. However, the displeasure over his indecision was widespread, both in the army ranks and elsewhere. Lybecker was recalled in autumn of 1713 and was court-martialled in Stockholm. After a drawn-out trial, where the bishop of Åbo (Turku), Johannes Gezelius the Younger, testified against him, he was sentenced to "loss of life, honor, and property". He was pardoned by the king on New Year's Day 1718, but confined to his estate Värsta, where he died on 4 June the same year.
