= Great Northern War =

Swedish-Russian conflict (1700–1721)

- Part of the Northern Wars
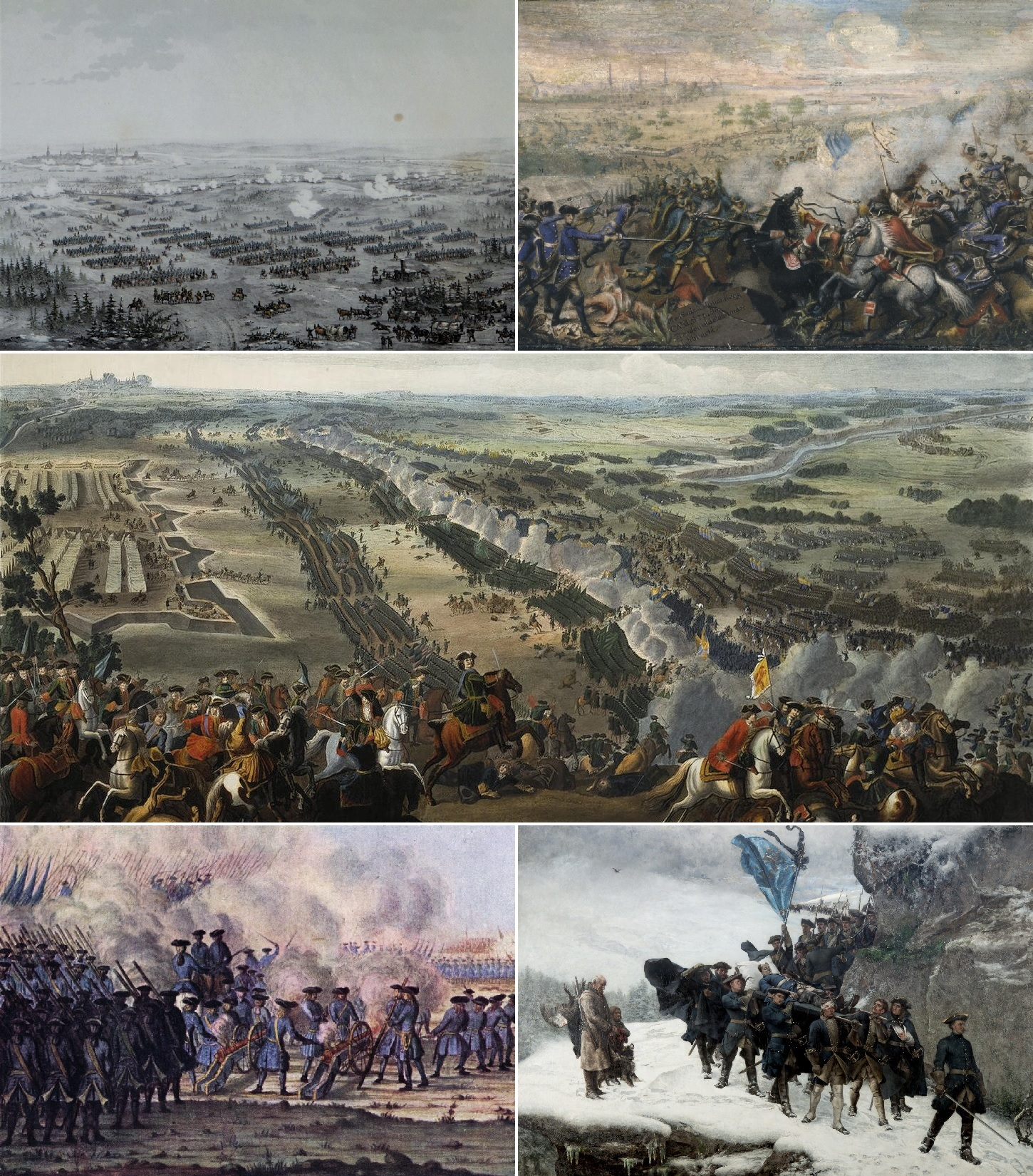
- Top to bottom, left to right: Battle of Narva (1700); Crossing of the Düna (1701); Battle of Poltava (1709); Battle of Gadebusch (1712); Bringing Home the Body of King Charles XII (1718)
Date	22 February 1700 – 10 September 1721 (21 years, 6 months and 19 days) N.S.
Location	Northern, Central and Eastern Europe
Result	Anti-Swedish coalition victory
Territorial changes	Treaty of Nystad: Russia gains the dominions of Estonia, Livonia and Ingria as well as parts of Kexholm and Viborg.; Treaties of Stockholm: Prussia gains parts of Swedish Pomerania; Hanover gains Bremen-Verden.; Treaty of Frederiksborg: Holstein-Gottorp loses its part of the Duchy of Schleswig to Denmark–Norway.

Belligerents
Swedish Empire; Holstein-Gottorp (1700; 1713–1720); Polish–Lithuanian Commonwealth (Note: The Commonwealth was initially not at war with Sweden. In 1701, however, Charles XII occupied the Duchy of Courland and Semigallia, a Commonwealth vassal state. In 1702, he invaded the Commonwealth, resulting in the creation of a confederacy against the Swedes. In 1704, the Swedish-led Warsaw Confederation was formed, which declared Stanisław Leszczyński king. A Polish civil war began as supporters of Augustus II responded with the Sandomierz Confederation that same year, declaring war on Sweden. When Leszczyński was crowned king in 1705, he allied Poland with Sweden by the treaty of Warsaw. Augustus II admitted defeat in 1706 by the treaty of Altranstädt, renouncing the Polish-Lithuanian Crown; anti-Leszczyński elements in the Commonwealth fought on until his return following the decisive Swedish defeat at Poltava in 1709. A formal Swedish-Polish peace treaty was not concluded until 1732, resulting in status quo ante bellum.) (1705–1709); Cossack Hetmanate (Note: The Cossack Hetmanate, often collectively referring to the Cossacks on the left (eastern) bank of the Dnieper and the largely autonomous Zaporozhian Cossacks, was a Russian protectorate under Hetman Ivan Mazepa. In October 1708, as the Swedish Army advanced into the Hetmanate, Mazepa defected to Charles XII with several thousand followers. A civil war ensued when the Russians and their loyal Cossacks elected a new hetman, Ivan Skoropadsky, whose puppet rule saw reduced Cossack autonomy. When Mazepa died in the Ottoman Empire after the defeat at Poltava, Pylyp Orlyk was chosen in 1710 as the new hetman in exile. He launched several campaigns against the Russians and their Cossack allies but was ultimately defeated and went into permanent exile in 1714.) (1708–1714); Zaporozhian Sich	Tsardom of Russia; Cossack Hetmanate; Kalmyk Khanate; Denmark–Norway (1700; 1709–1720); Saxony (Note: While Saxony's active participation in the Great Northern War ended in 1717, a formal Swedish-Saxon peace treaty was not concluded until 1729, resulting in status quo ante bellum.) (1700–1706; from 1709); Polish–Lithuanian Commonwealth (1701–1706; from 1709); Prussia (1715–1720); Hanover (1715–1719)
Supported by: Ottoman Empire (1710–1713); (Kingdom of Great Britain) Great Britain (1719–1720); England (1700); Dutch Republic (1700); Hanover (1700)	Supported by: (Kingdom of Great Britain) Great Britain (1715–1719); Courland–Semigallia (1700–1701)

Commanders and leaders
Charles XII †; Ulrika Eleonora; Frederick I; Rehnskiöld; Lewenhaupt #; Stenbock #; Schlippenbach; Armfeldt; Lybecker #; Frederick IV †; Charles Frederick; Stanisław I; Potocki; Sapieha #; Mazepa #; Orlyk; Hordiienko	Peter I; Menshikov; Sheremetev #; Apraksin; Patkul (executed); Repnin; Mazepa (till late 1708); Skoropadsky; (Kalmyk Khanate) Ayuka Khan; (Denmark–Norway) Frederick IV; Reventlow; Tordenskjold; Augustus II; Schulenburg; Flemming; Sieniawski; Ogiński #; (Kingdom of Prussia) Frederick William I; Leopold I; (Electorate of Brunswick-Lüneburg) (Kingdom of Great Britain) George I

Strength
At peak: 100,000; 43 ships of the line; 2,695; 36,500; 7,000–12,000	At peak: 200,000; 37 ships of the line; 30,000–50,000; (Kalmyk Khanate) 15,000; (Denmark–Norway) 60,000; 41 ships of the line; 29,900; 70,000; (Kingdom of Prussia) 56,575; (Electorate of Brunswick-Lüneburg) 20,000

Casualties and losses
200,000+ military deaths (Note: Sweden suffered at least 200,000 deaths, of which 120,000 were allotted soldiers, and 80,000 mercenaries, artillerists and navy-personnel from Sweden proper as well as its overseas territories. Other estimates include at least 50,000 men dead from the overseas territories, and 200,000 from Sweden proper, including 40,000 to 50,000 Finns; of these, 170,000 were from the army and 20,000 navy-personnel, while 15,000 were officers and NCOs. Losses for Sweden's allies are unknown.)	400,000+ military deaths (Note: The Russian Army lost c. 300,000 military personnel in the war, 30,000 to 40,000 of which died as a result of combat (out of some 120,000 killed, wounded and shell-shocked). Saxony lost up to 40,000 men prior to 1707, while its losses after 1709 are unknown. Denmark–Norway lost up to 60,000 men from 1709 to 1719, while its losses in 1700 are unknown. Losses for their remaining allies are unknown.)
- 1,000,000+ total deaths (Note: It is probable that more than a million people died in the Great Northern War, with Sweden alone suffering 350,000 deaths on a population of 2,500,000, including overseas territories. The population of the Polish–Lithuanian Commonwealth was reduced to 6,500,000 by 1720, from 8,000,000 before the war. An estimated 400,000 soldiers and civilians on both sides died in the war from direct war-related violence.)

In the Great Northern War (1700–1721), a coalition led by Russia successfully contested the supremacy of Sweden in Northern, Central and Eastern Europe. The initial leaders of the anti-Swedish alliance were Peter I of Russia, Frederick IV of Denmark–Norway and Augustus II the Strong of Saxony-Poland-Lithuania. Frederick IV and Augustus II were defeated by Sweden, under Charles XII, and forced out of the alliance in 1700 and 1706, respectively, but rejoined it in 1709 after the defeat of Charles XII at the Battle of Poltava. George I of Great Britain and the Electorate of Hanover joined the coalition in 1714 for Hanover and in 1717 for Britain, and Frederick William I of Brandenburg-Prussia joined it in 1715.

Charles XII led the Swedish Army. Swedish allies included Holstein-Gottorp, several Polish magnates under Stanisław I Leszczyński (1704–1710) and Cossacks under the Ukrainian Hetman Ivan Mazepa (1708–1710). The Ottoman Empire temporarily hosted Charles XII of Sweden and intervened against Peter I.

The war began when Denmark–Norway, Saxony and Russia, sensing an opportunity as Sweden was ruled by the young Charles XII, formed a coalition against Sweden. Denmark invaded Sweden's ally Holstein-Gottorp, while Saxony and Russia declared war on the Swedish Empire and attacked Swedish Livonia and Swedish Ingria, respectively. Sweden parried the Danes at Travendal (August 1700) and the Russians at Narva (November 1700), and in a counter-offensive pushed Augustus II's forces through the Polish–Lithuanian Commonwealth to Saxony, dethroning Augustus on the way (September 1706) and forcing him to acknowledge defeat in the Treaty of Altranstädt (October 1706). The treaty also secured the extradition and execution of Johann Reinhold Patkul, architect of the alliance seven years earlier. Meanwhile, the forces of Peter I had recovered from defeat at Narva and gained ground in Sweden's Baltic provinces, where they cemented Russian access to the Baltic Sea by founding Saint Petersburg in 1703. Charles XII moved from Saxony into Russia to confront Peter, but the campaign ended in 1709 with the destruction of the main Swedish army at the decisive Battle of Poltava (in present-day Ukraine) and Charles' exile in the Ottoman town of Bender. The Ottoman Empire defeated the Russian–Moldavian army in the Pruth River Campaign, but that peace treaty was in the end without great consequence to Russia's position.

After Poltava, the anti-Swedish coalition revived and subsequently Hanover and Prussia joined it. The remaining Swedish forces in plague-stricken areas south and east of the Baltic Sea were evicted, with the last city, Tallinn, falling in the autumn of 1710. By 1714, Russia had occupied Finland.

On 18 October 1709, Sweden received Denmark-Norway’s declaration of war, presented as a response to the alleged maltreatment of Danes by Sweden in Scania. Swedish victory at Helsingborg amounted to only a brief respite before ultimate defeat in the west.

From June 1716, Denmark and Russia prepared a joint invasion of Sweden proper, which the Tsar envisioned as dealing the Swedish king a decisive blow. Earlier that year, Charles XII had invaded south-eastern Norway, but a string of successive defeats, together with the systematic disruption of Swedish logistics by the Norwegians, had forced him back towards the border. In June and July, a renewed offensive against Fredrikshald, or Halden, was frustrated by the combined efforts of the town's garrison and inhabitants. The campaign was finally abandoned after Tordenskjold, the Norwegian naval hero, captured almost the entire Swedish supply and transport fleet at Dynekilen, forcing Charles XII to finally retreat across the border. In the meantime, a Danish-Russian invasion force was assembling across the strait. Severe delays, however, pushed the operation into autumn and, together with growing distrust and strategic divergence between the allied monarchs, ultimately led to its cancellation.

In 1718, Sweden launched a second and even larger campaign against Norway. Charles XII was ultimately killed in the trenches before Fredriksten, while a second Swedish field army was forced onto the Carolean Death March during its retreat from Trøndelag, losing most of its men. The failure of the Norwegian campaign constituted a severe strategic defeat for Sweden and effectively brought its offensive war to an end.

The war ended with the defeat of Sweden, leaving Russia as the new dominant power in the Baltic region and as a new major force in European politics. The Western powers, Great Britain and France, became caught up in the separate War of the Spanish Succession (1701–1714), which broke out over the Bourbon Philip of Anjou's succession to the Spanish throne and a possible joining of France and Spain. The formal conclusion of the Great Northern War came with the Swedish-Hanoverian and Swedish-Prussian Treaties of Stockholm (1719), the Dano-Swedish Treaty of Frederiksborg (1720), and the Russo-Swedish Treaty of Nystad (1721). By these treaties Sweden ceded its exemption from the Sound Dues and lost the Baltic provinces and the southern part of Swedish Pomerania. The peace treaties also ended its alliance with Holstein-Gottorp. Hanover gained Bremen-Verden, Brandenburg-Prussia incorporated the Oder estuary (Stettin Lagoons), Russia secured the Baltic Provinces, and Denmark strengthened its position in Schleswig-Holstein. In Sweden, the absolute monarchy had come to an end with the death of Charles XII, and Sweden's Age of Liberty began.

== Background ==
Between 1560 and 1658, Sweden created a Baltic empire centred on the Gulf of Finland and comprising the provinces of Karelia, Ingria, Estonia, and Livonia. During the Thirty Years' War, Sweden gained tracts in Germany as well, including Western Pomerania, Wismar, and the duchies of Bremen and Verden. During the same period, Sweden conquered Danish and Norwegian provinces north of the Sound (1645; 1658). These victories may be ascribed to a well-trained army, which, despite its comparatively small size, was far more professional than most continental armies, and also to a modernization of administration (both civilian and military) in the course of the 17th century, which enabled the monarchy to harness the resources of the country and its empire effectively. Fighting in the field, the Swedish Army (which during the Thirty Years' War contained more German and Scottish mercenaries than ethnic Swedes, but was administered by the Swedish Crown) was able, in particular, to make quick, sustained marches across large tracts of land and to maintain a high rate of small arms fire due to proficient military drill.

However, the Swedish state ultimately proved unable to support and maintain its army in a prolonged war. Campaigns on the continent had been proposed on the basis that the army would be financially self-supporting through plunder and taxation of newly gained land, a concept shared by most major powers of the period. The cost of the warfare proved to be much higher than the occupied countries could fund, and Sweden's coffers and resources in manpower were eventually drained in the course of a long war.

The foreign interventions in Russia during the Time of Troubles resulted in Swedish gains in the Treaty of Stolbovo (1617). The treaty deprived Russia of direct access to the Baltic Sea. Russian fortunes began to reverse in the final years of the 17th century, notably with the rise to power of Peter the Great, who looked to address the earlier losses and re-establish a Baltic presence. In the late 1690s, the adventurer Johann Patkul managed to ally Russia with Denmark and Saxony by the secret Treaty of Preobrazhenskoye, and in 1700 the three powers attacked.

== Sweden and allies ==
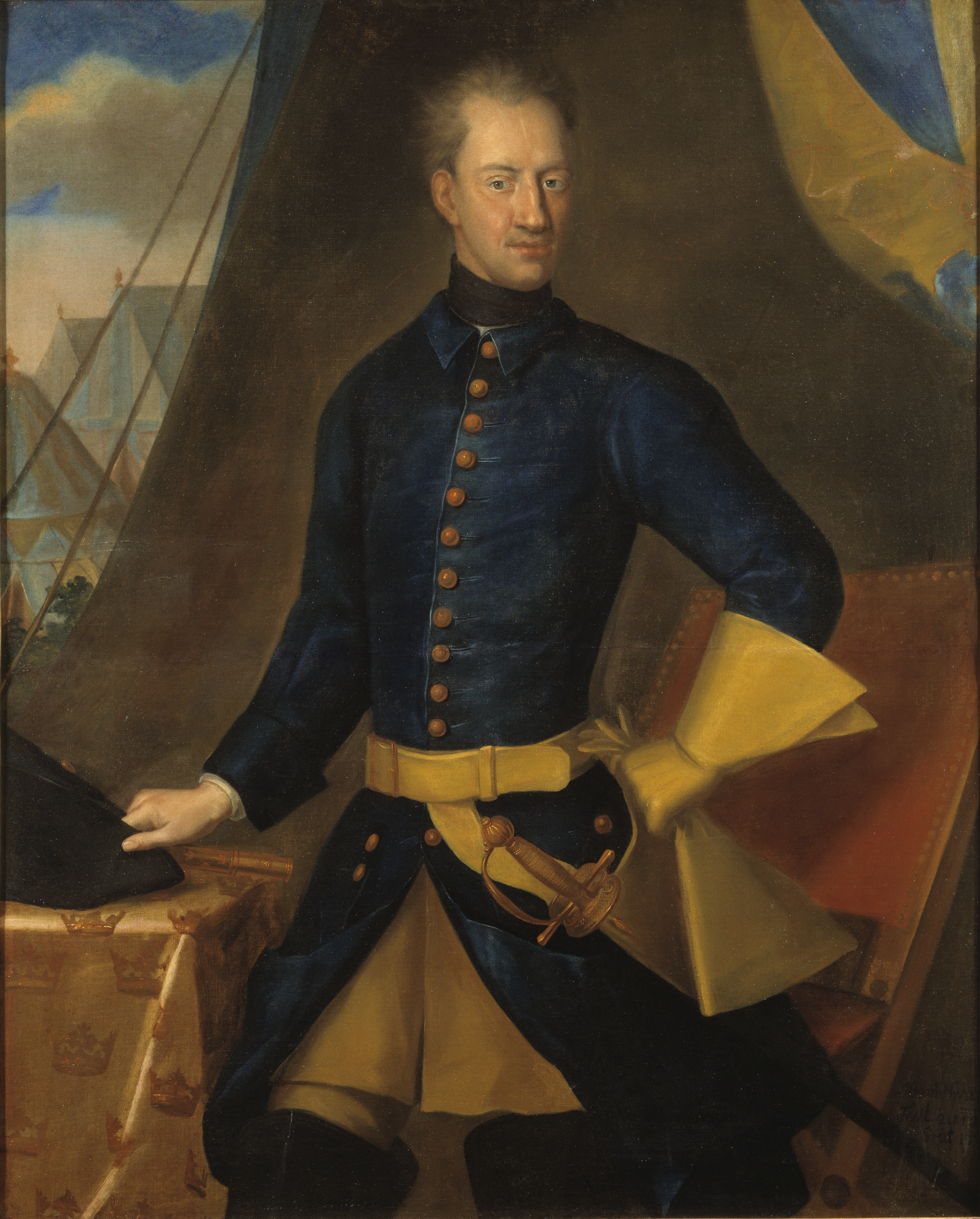
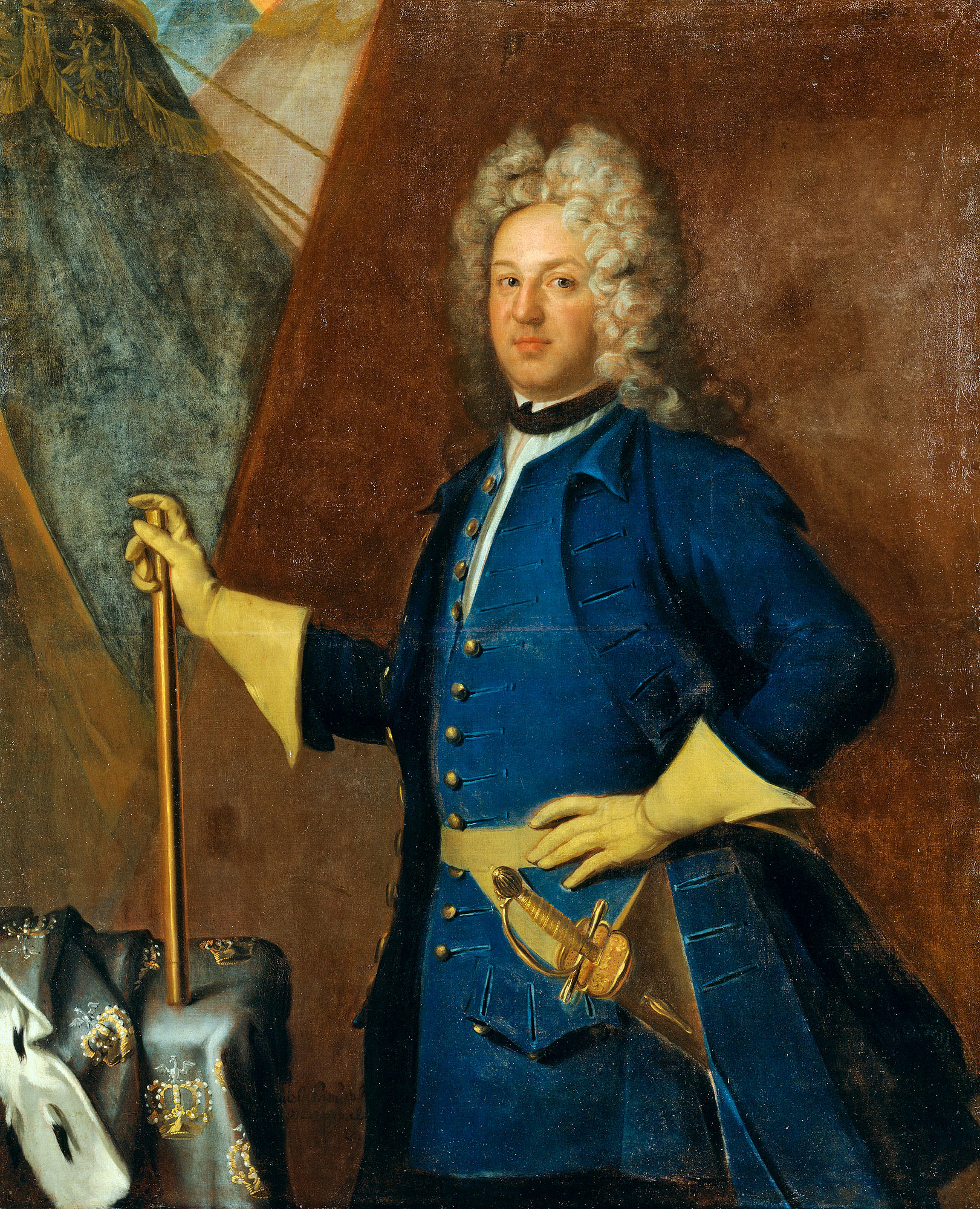
Charles XII of Sweden and Stanisław I of Poland

Charles XII of Sweden (Note: Charles XII of Sweden, Frederick IV of Holstein-Gottorp, Augustus II and Frederick IV of Denmark-Norway were all grandsons of Frederik III of Denmark-Norway) succeeded Charles XI of Sweden in 1697, aged 14. From his predecessor, he took over the Swedish Empire as an absolute monarch. Charles XI had tried to keep the empire out of wars, and concentrated on inner reforms such as reduction and allotment, which had strengthened the monarch's status and the empire's military abilities. Charles XII refrained from all kinds of luxury and alcohol and usage of the French language, since he considered these things decadent and superfluous. He preferred the life of an ordinary soldier on horseback, not that of contemporary baroque courts. He determinedly pursued his goal of dethroning his adversaries, whom he considered unworthy of their thrones due to broken promises, thereby refusing to take several chances to make peace. During the war, the most important Swedish commanders besides Charles XII were his close friend Carl Gustav Rehnskiöld, also Magnus Stenbock and Adam Ludwig Lewenhaupt.

Charles Frederick, son of Frederick IV, Duke of Holstein-Gottorp (a cousin of Charles XII) and Hedvig Sophia, daughter of Charles XI of Sweden, had been the Swedish heir since 1702. He claimed the throne upon Charles XII's death in 1718, but was supplanted by Ulrike Eleonora. Charles Frederick was married to a daughter of Peter I, Anna Petrovna.

Ivan Mazepa was a Ukrainian Cossack hetman who fought for Russia but defected to Charles XII in 1708. Mazepa died in 1709 in Ottoman exile.

=== Army size ===
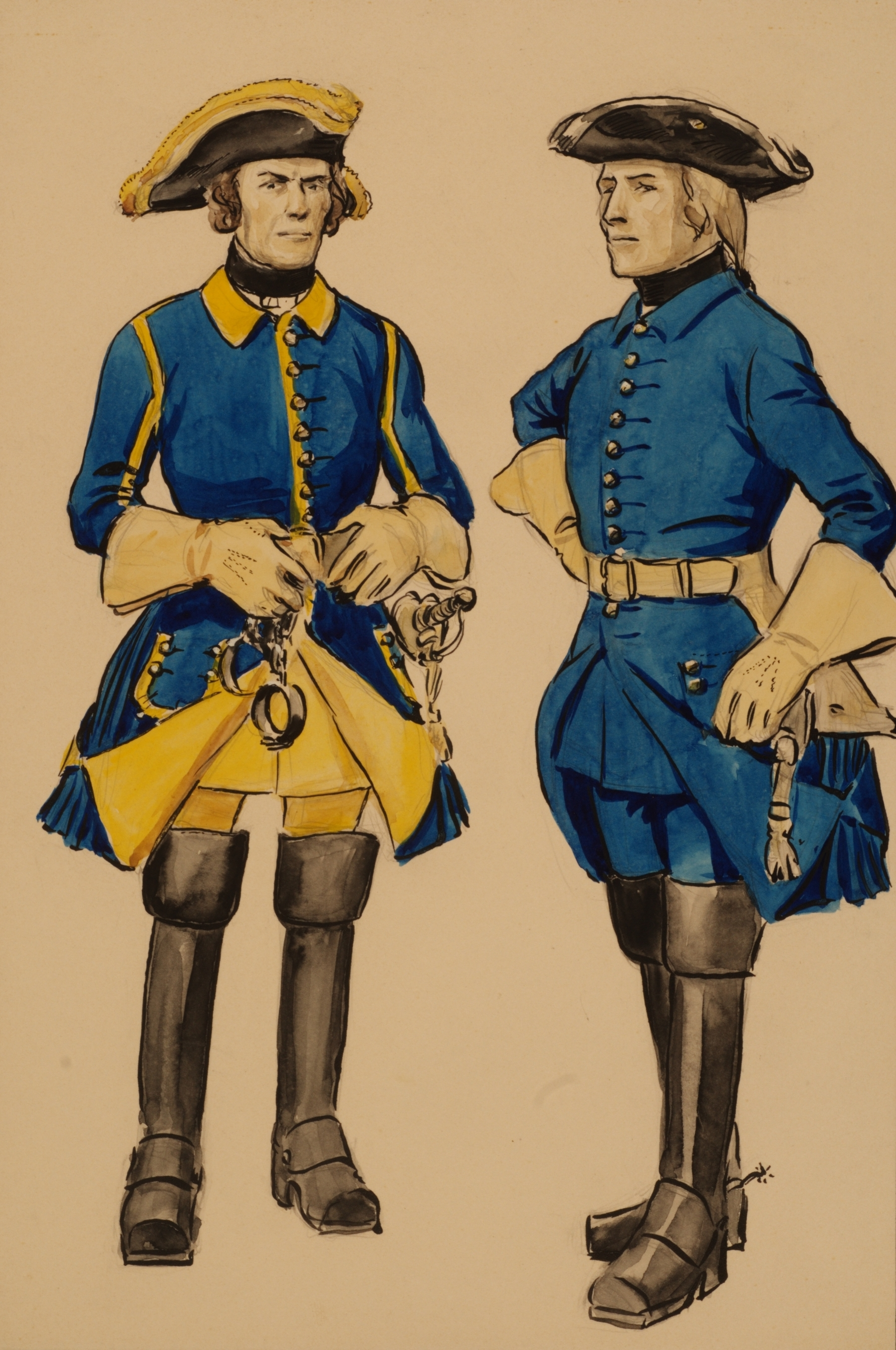
Swedish cavalry of the Västergötland Regiment

Sweden's army peaked in 1707–1708 with an effective strength of about 100,000 men, and a nominal size of between 110,000 and 115,000 men. It fielded about 65,000 men at the outbreak of the war, and 40,000 in 1716. Charles XII mustered 60,000 to 70,000 men for the Norwegian campaign of 1718, which was reduced to 45,000 towards the end of the war. In early 1700, the Swedish Navy consisted of 39 battleships (ships of the line) of 48,000 tonnes, eight major and six minor cruising warships and one bomb vessel (4,500 tonnes). The battleship-fleet peaked in 1705–1709, with 43 ships (56,000 tonnes); as peace was concluded in 1721, only 23 battleships (32,000 tonnes) remained, several of which were unrepairable or nearing the end of their service life.

Holstein-Gottorp had an army of about 2,695 when the Danes attacked in 1700 and laid siege to Tönning. At the second siege in 1713–1714, the garrison had 1,600 men with the rest fighting in the War of the Spanish Succession; these would later enter Swedish service as Holstein was occupied by the Danes.

By 1707, at the eve of the Russian campaign, the pro-Leszczyński followers in Poland had swollen to 20,000 men from a core of 6,000. In addition, there were 4,000 to 5,000 troops of Sapieha's army and 12,040 of the Lithuanian Crown Army, now loyal to Stanisław I.

Modern estimates puts the army Mazepa brought with him to Charles XII in 1708 at 2,000 to 4,000 Cossacks, in addition to some 5,000 left behind at Baturyn who were subsequently all killed or captured in the Sack of Baturyn. It peaked at 6,000 to 12,000 men the following year when 4,000 to 8,000 Zaporozhian Cossacks joined the Swedes and Ukrainian Cossacks on 10 May – at least 11,000 had thus switched sides in total.

== Anti-Swedish coalition ==
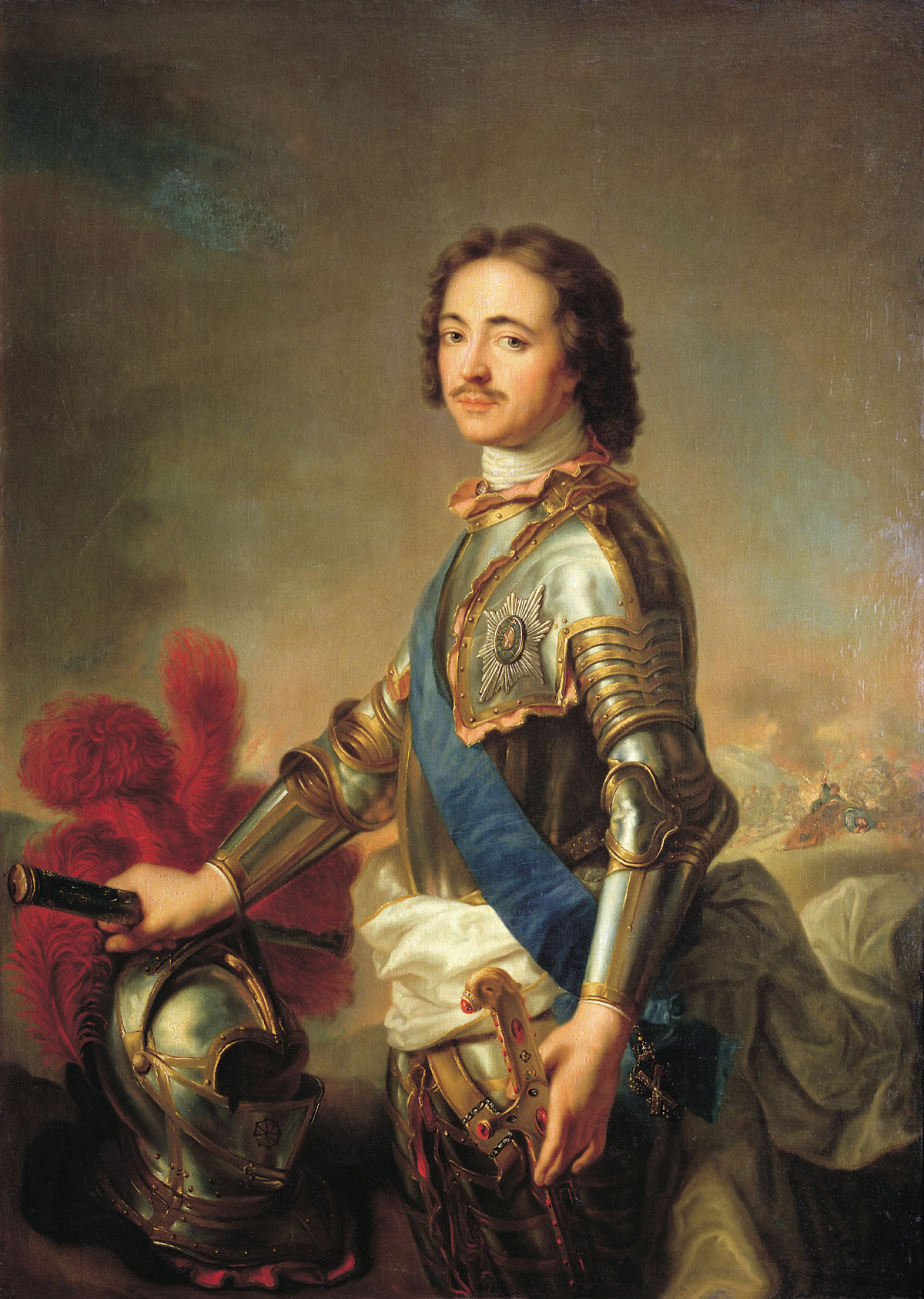
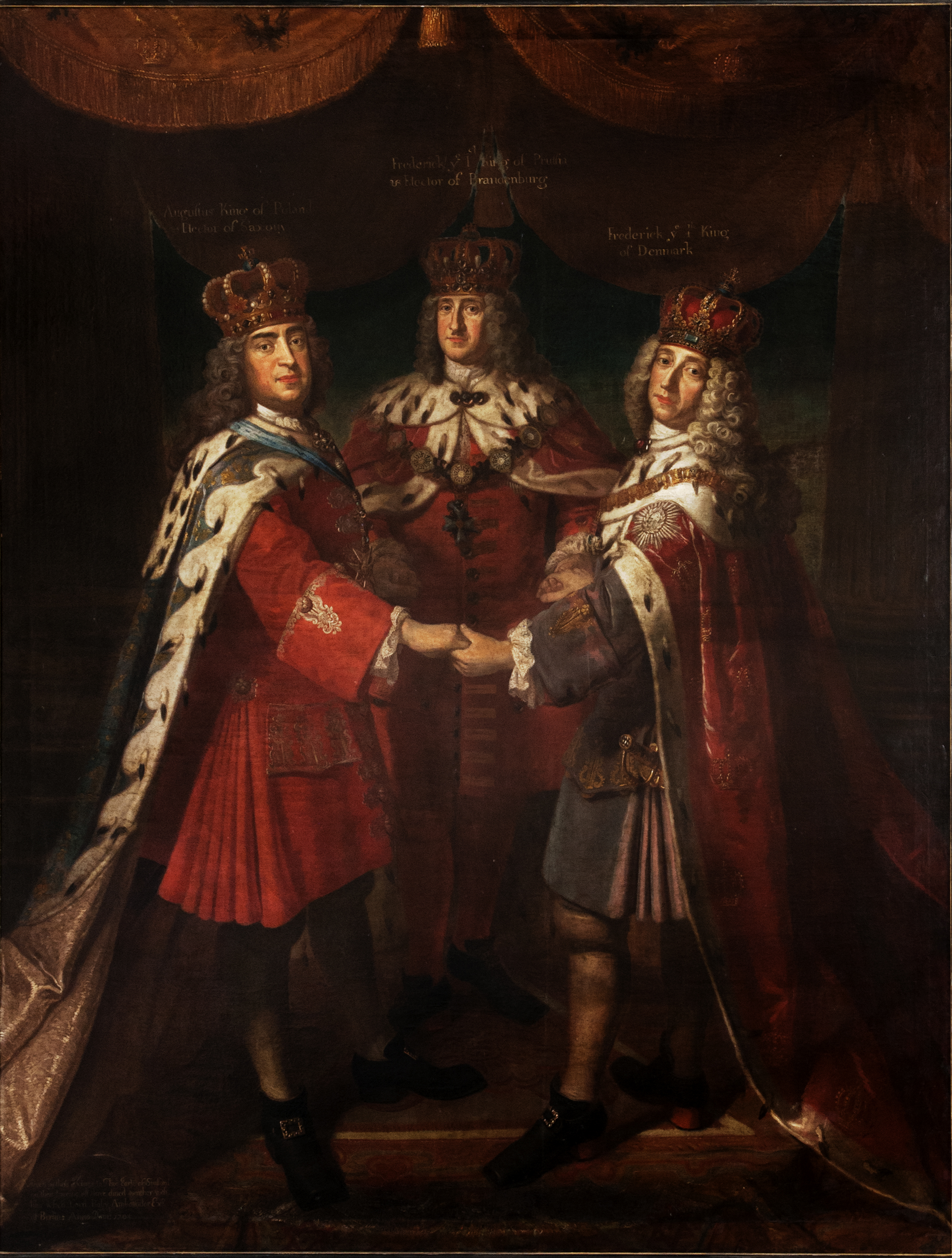
Peter I of Russia, and Augustus II of Poland (left), Frederick I of Prussia (center) and Frederick IV of Denmark (right)

Peter the Great became Tsar in 1682 upon the death of his elder brother Feodor but did not become the actual ruler until 1689. He commenced reforming the country, turning the Russian tsardom into a modernized empire relying on trade and on a strong, professional army and navy. He greatly expanded the size of Russia during his reign while providing access to the Baltic, Black, and Caspian seas. Beside Peter, the principal Russian commanders were Aleksandr Danilovich Menshikov and Boris Sheremetev.

Augustus II the Strong, elector of Saxony and another cousin of Charles XII, gained the Polish crown after the death of King John III Sobieski in 1696. His ambitions to transform the Polish–Lithuanian Commonwealth into an absolute monarchy were not realized due to the zealous nature of the Polish nobility and the previously initiated laws that decreased the power of the monarch. His meeting with Peter the Great in Rawa Ruska in September 1698, where the plans to attack Sweden were made, became legendary for its decadence.

Frederick IV of Denmark–Norway, another cousin of Charles XII, succeeded Christian V in 1699 and continued his anti-Swedish policies. After the setbacks of 1700, he focused on transforming his state, an absolute monarchy, in a manner similar to Charles XI of Sweden. He did not achieve his main goal: to regain the former eastern Danish provinces lost to Sweden in the course of the 17th century. He was not able to keep northern Swedish Pomerania, Danish from 1712 to 1715. He did put an end to the Swedish threat south of Denmark. He ended Sweden's exemption from the Sound Dues (transit taxes/tariffs on cargo moved between the North Sea and the Baltic Sea).

Frederick William I entered the war as elector of Brandenburg and king in Prussia—the royal title had been secured in 1701. He was determined to gain the Oder estuary with its access to the Baltic Sea for the Brandenburgian core areas, which had been a state goal for centuries.

George I of the House of Hanover, elector of Hanover and, since 1714, king of Great Britain and of Ireland, took the opportunity to connect his landlocked German electorate to the North Sea.

=== Coalition armies ===
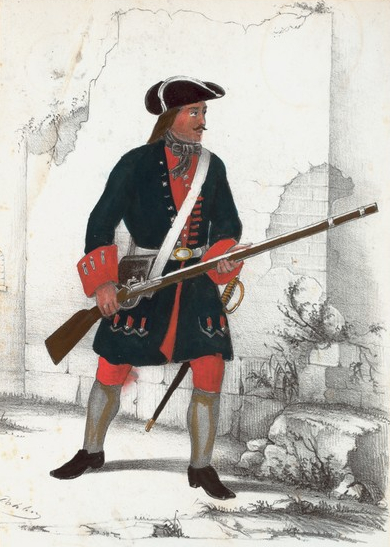
Russian guard of the Semyonovsky Regiment

Russia's army had 120,000 men in the late 1600s, not including Cossacks and Kalmucks. It quickly grew to between 168,000 and 200,000 effective troops in the early years of 1702 to 1705. Russia had 200,000 men under arms in 1707, and the army remained at between 164,000 (1711) and 200,000 (1719) for the rest of the war. Other sources mention 220,000 troops by 1710, without specifying if the number includes Cossacks and Kalmucks. By the time of Peter I's death in 1725, there were 210,000 regular troops in the army. Between 1710 and 1712, the Russian Navy launched their first five battleships on the Baltic Sea from Saint Petersburg, with 17 more being launched by 1721. In addition, seven more were built in Arkhangelsk, while 16 were purchased and three built by other nations. By 1721, the Baltic Fleet had grown to 37 battleships, nine frigates and two bomb vessels, totalling 55,000 tonnes, not counting an estimated 50 major galleys and 120 small oared craft.

Estimates has the number of Cossacks fighting for Russia at between 30,000 and 50,000, and the Kalmucks at 15,000. Other sources puts the Cossacks and Kalmucks at 40,000 to 45,000, up to 100,000, and even 150,000 to 200,000 men.

For the most part, the Saxon Army had a nominal strength of 30,000 regular troops. However, only a limited effective strength could be achieved due to severe losses; the army had 18,000 men in 1700 and, including the losses sustained at the Battle of Kliszów, 25,000 in August 1702. By 1717, it had reached an effective strength of 29,900 men. There were also an unknown number of militia to provide or reinforce garrisons; in 1706, at the time of Swedish invasion of Saxony, they reportedly counted 5,000 men. After the introduction of a new system in 1709, there were eight militia regiments.

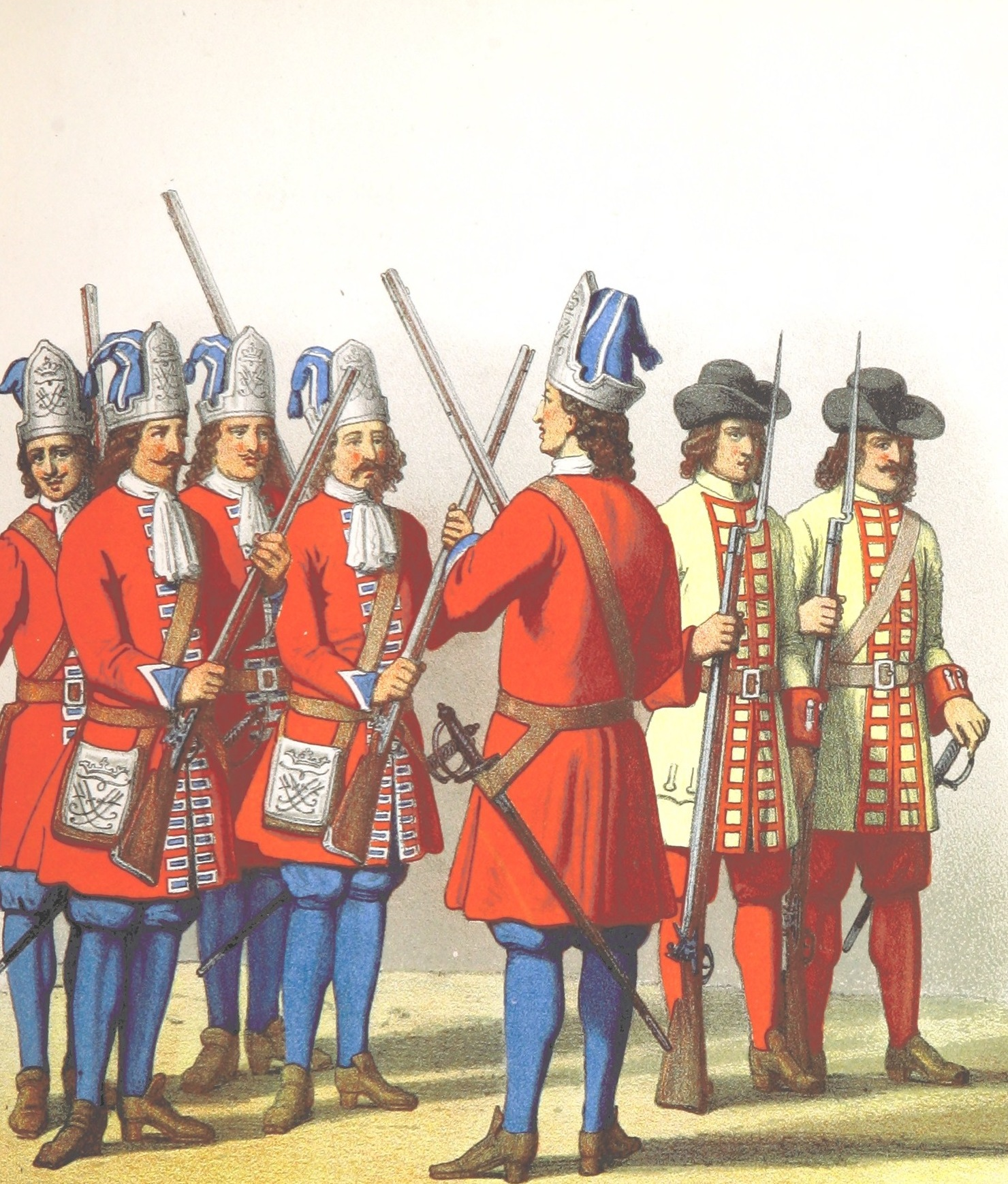
Uniforms of two Danish guard regiments in 1703

According to the military regulations of 1699, the Danish and Norwegian armies counted 23,021 and 12,848 men, respectively, while a subsequent muster recalled 13,660 for the latter. The Danish Army had about 38,900 mercenaries, provincial and militia troops as hostilities were renewed in 1709, excluding the contingents leased to the maritime powers in the War of the Spanish Succession, while the Norwegian Army had 17,500 men. As the contingents returned ahead of the Pomeranian campaign of 1715, the Danish Army was reorganised into a near-effective force of about 35,000. The Norwegians had 24,379 men at New Year's Eve 1715–1716, including three regiments temporarily transferred to the Danish Army. In early 1700, the Danish Navy consisted of 32 battleships and 26 cruising warships of 42,000 and 7,000 tonnes, respectively, as well as six bomb vessels, six blockships and seven galleys. Denmark's battleship-fleet peaked ahead of its second intervention of 1709, with 41 ships (58,000 tonnes). In 1721, 25 battleships (38,000 tonnes) remained.

In 1702, as the Swedes invaded Poland with 21,000 men, the Polish and Lithuanian Crown armies had 13,000 to 18,140 men, and 4,000 to 7,400 men, respectively. In 1703, the Polish Sejm agreed to raise the Polish and Lithuanian armies to 36,000 and 12,000 men, respectively. In total, 90,000 Poles and Lithuanians fought at the height of the Polish civil war which started in 1704; 70,000 of which would oppose the Swedes and their Polish puppet-king, Stanisław I, or about three quarters of a total of 100,000 combatants.

In 1715, the year Prussia entered the war against Sweden, the standing Prussian Army counted 45,688 men. It had increased to 56,575 men in 1720, the year Prussia left the war. The Hanoverian Army had about 20,000 men at its entry into the Great Northern War in 1715.

Size of European armies in 1710
Population ~1650 (millions)		Size of Army (thousands)
State	Size	~1710
Denmark–Norway	1.3	53
Swedish Empire	1.1	100
Brandenburg-Prussia	0.5	40
Polish–Lithuanian Commonwealth	11	100*
Tsardom of Russia	15	170
Kingdom of England	4.7	87
Dutch Republic	1.5	120
Kingdom of France	18	340–380
Habsburg Monarchy	8	110–130
Crown of Castile; Crown of Aragon	7	50
Ottoman Empire	18	50**
*All Polish forces, on both sides in the Great Northern War.		**Janissaries only.

== 1700: Denmark, Riga and Narva ==
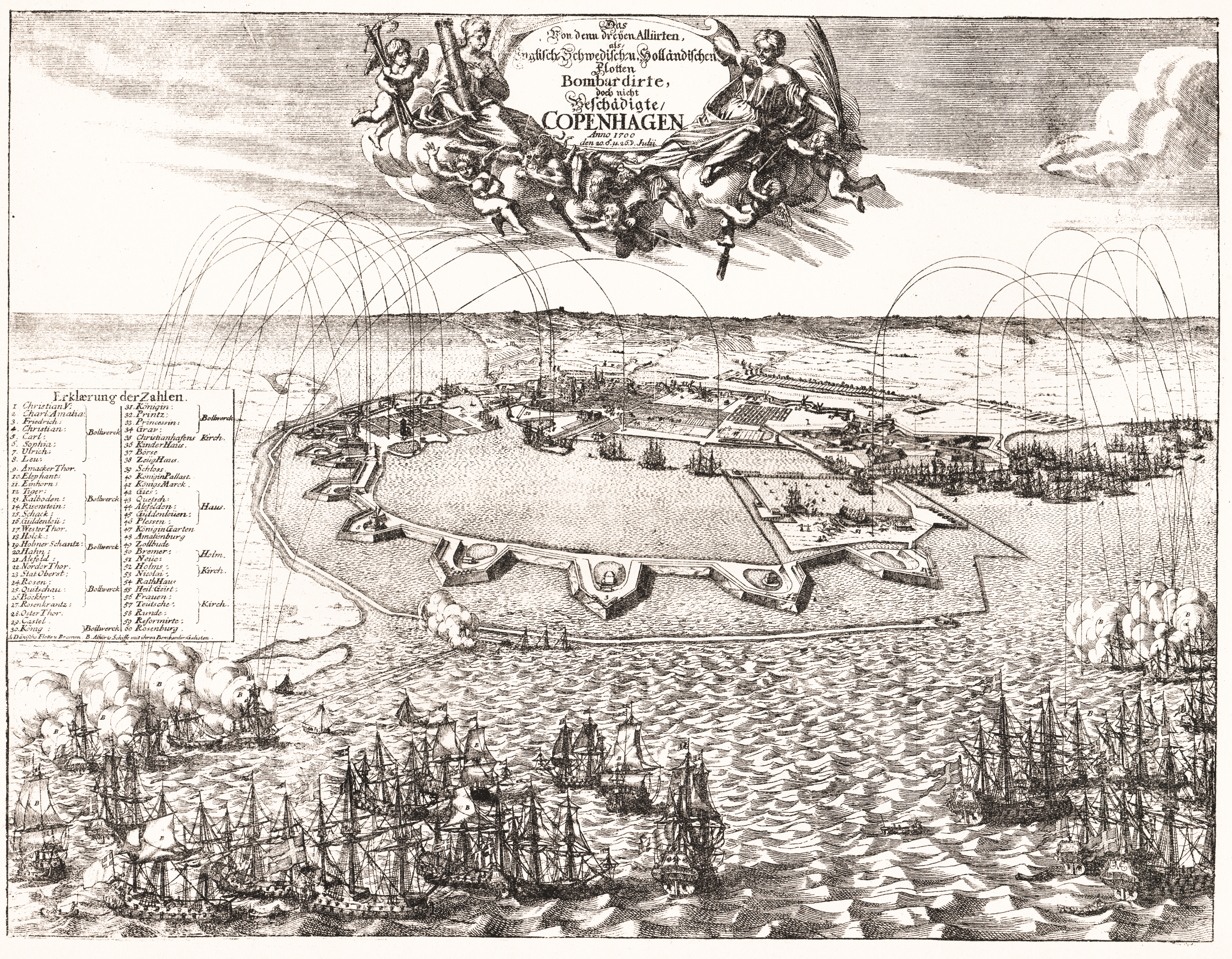
The bombardment of Copenhagen, 1700

Frederik IV of Denmark–Norway directed his first attack against Holstein-Gottorp, a Swedish client state and long-time rival of Denmark; Sweden, along with the Maritime Powers of England and the Dutch Republic, were guarantors of its sovereignty by the Convention of Altona in 1689, which ended a previous conflict between the two. Hanover (Lüneburg), another ally of Holstein-Gottorp, would also assemble a relief-force. In March 1700, a Danish army laid siege to Tönning. Simultaneously, Augustus II's forces advanced through Swedish Livonia, captured Dünamünde and laid siege to Riga.

Charles XII of Sweden first focused on Denmark. The Swedish navy was able to outmaneuver the Danish Sound blockade and, in conjunction with an Anglo-Dutch fleet, carried out a bombardment of Copenhagen from 20 to 26 July 1700. This allowed Charles XII to land an army at Humlebæk near the Danish capital, Copenhagen, while a Swedish-Hanoverian force broke through the Danish defenses at Reinbek to relieve Tönning. The surprise move and pressure by the Maritime Powers forced Denmark–Norway to withdraw from the war in August 1700 according to the terms of the Peace of Travendal.

Charles XII was now able to speedily deploy his army to the eastern coast of the Baltic Sea and face his remaining enemies: besides the army of Augustus II in Livonia, an army of Russian tsar Peter I was already on its way to invade Swedish Ingria, where it laid siege to Narva in October. In November, the Russian and Swedish armies met at the First Battle of Narva where the Russians suffered a crushing defeat.

After the dissolution of the first coalition through the peace of Travendal and with the victory at Narva, the Swedish chancellor, Benedict Oxenstjerna, attempted to use the bidding for the favour of Sweden by France and the Maritime Powers (then on the eve of the War of the Spanish Succession) to end the war and make Charles an arbiter of Europe.

== 1701–1706: Poland-Lithuania and Saxony ==
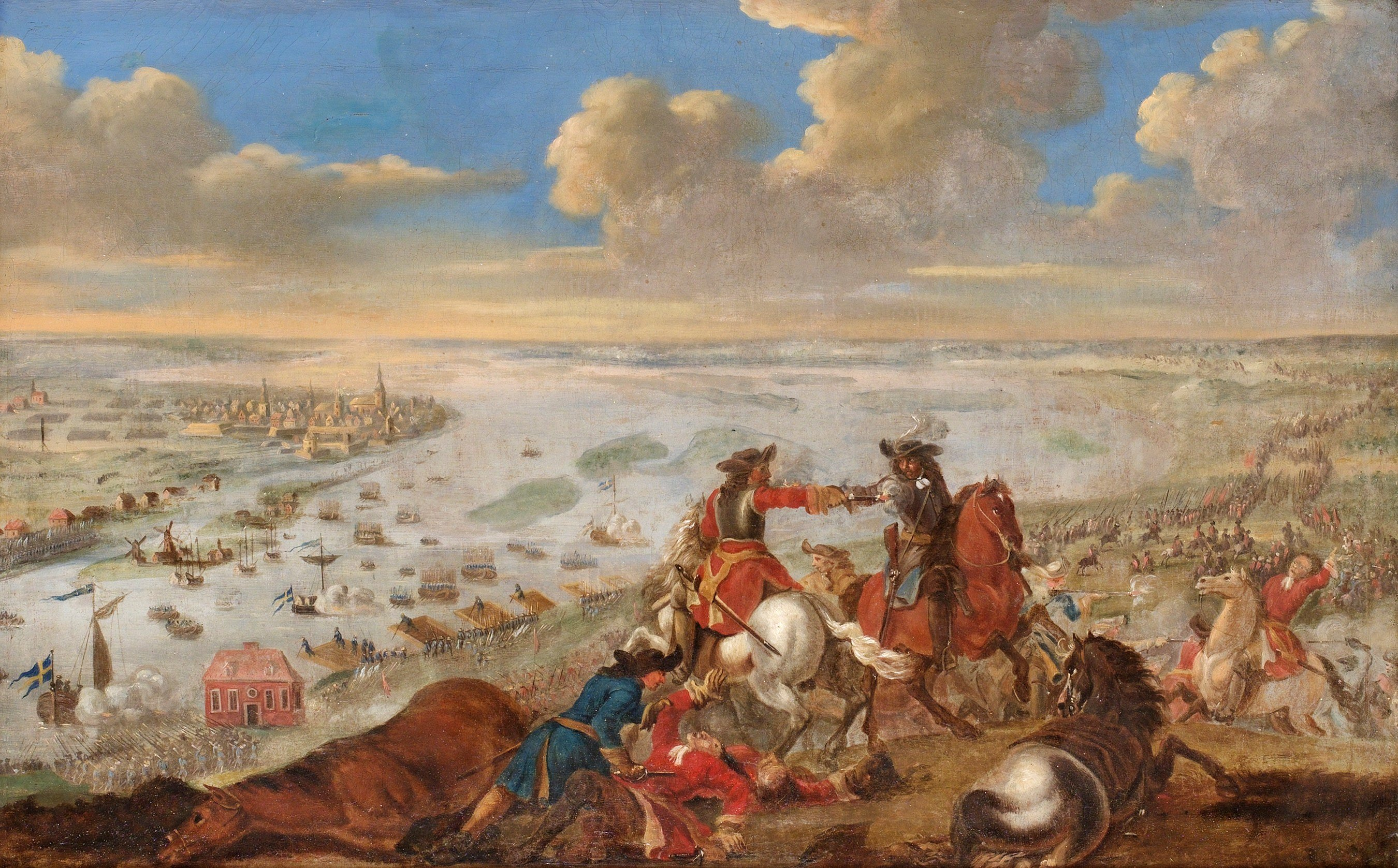
Battle of Riga, the first major battle of the Swedish invasion of Poland, 1701

Charles XII then turned south to meet Augustus II, Elector of Saxony, King of Poland and Grand Duke of Lithuania. The Polish–Lithuanian Commonwealth was formally neutral at this point, as Augustus started the war as Elector of Saxony. Charles XII, however, defeated the Saxons and Russians at the Crossing of the Düna in 1701 and subsequently occupied the Duchy of Courland and Semigallia, a Polish vassal state. Disregarding Polish negotiation proposals supported by the Swedish parliament, Charles XII then invaded Poland and Lithuania, decisively defeating the Saxon-Polish forces in the Battle of Kliszów in 1702 and in the Battle of Pultusk in 1703. This successful invasion enabled Charles XII to dethrone Augustus II and coerce the Polish sejm to replace him with Stanisław Leszczyński in 1704, with help of the newly formed Swedish-led Warsaw Confederation. In response, an anti-Swedish Sandomierz Confederation in support of Augustus II was created the same year. In 1705, Leszczyński was crowned Stanisław I of Poland and Lithuania, following which a Swedish–Polish treaty was signed; in practice, it subordinated the Commonwealth to Sweden both economically and militarily.

August II resisted, still possessing control of his native Saxony, but was decisively defeated at the Battle of Fraustadt in 1706, a battle sometimes compared to the Ancient Battle of Cannae due to the Swedish forces' use of double envelopment, with a deadly result for the Saxon Army. In 1706, after a Swedish invasion of Saxony, August II was forced to sign the Treaty of Altranstädt in which he made peace with the Swedish Empire, renounced his claims to the Polish crown, accepted Stanislaus Leszczyński as king, and ended his alliance with Russia. Patkul was also extradited and executed by breaking on the wheel in 1707, an incident which, given his diplomatic immunity, infuriated opinion against the Swedish king, who was then expected to win the war against the only hostile power remaining, Tsar Peter's Russia.

== 1702–1710: Russia and the Baltic provinces ==
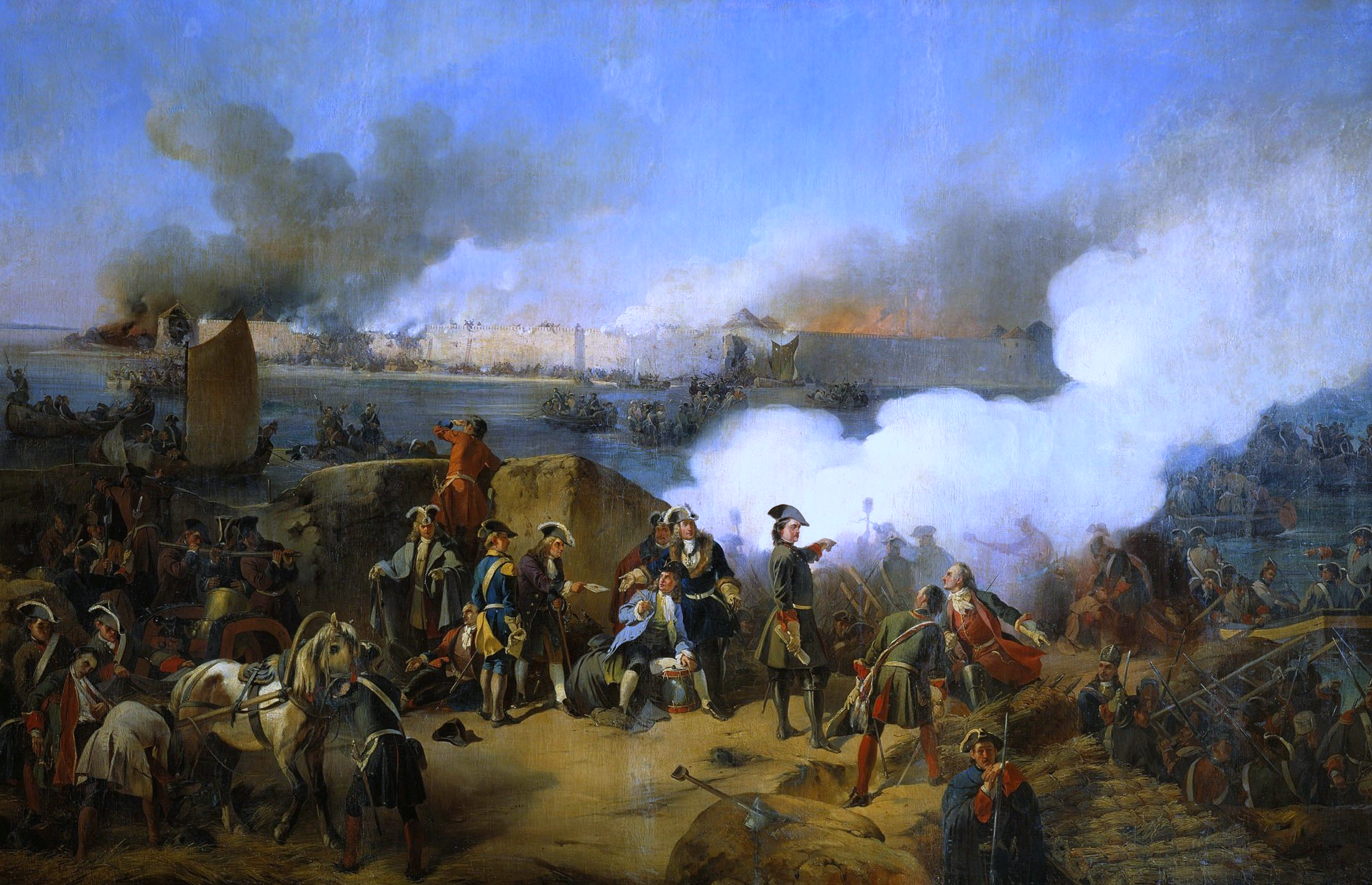
Peter the Great assaults the island fortress of Nöteborg, which he renamed Shlisselburg, recognising it as the "key" to taking Ingria.

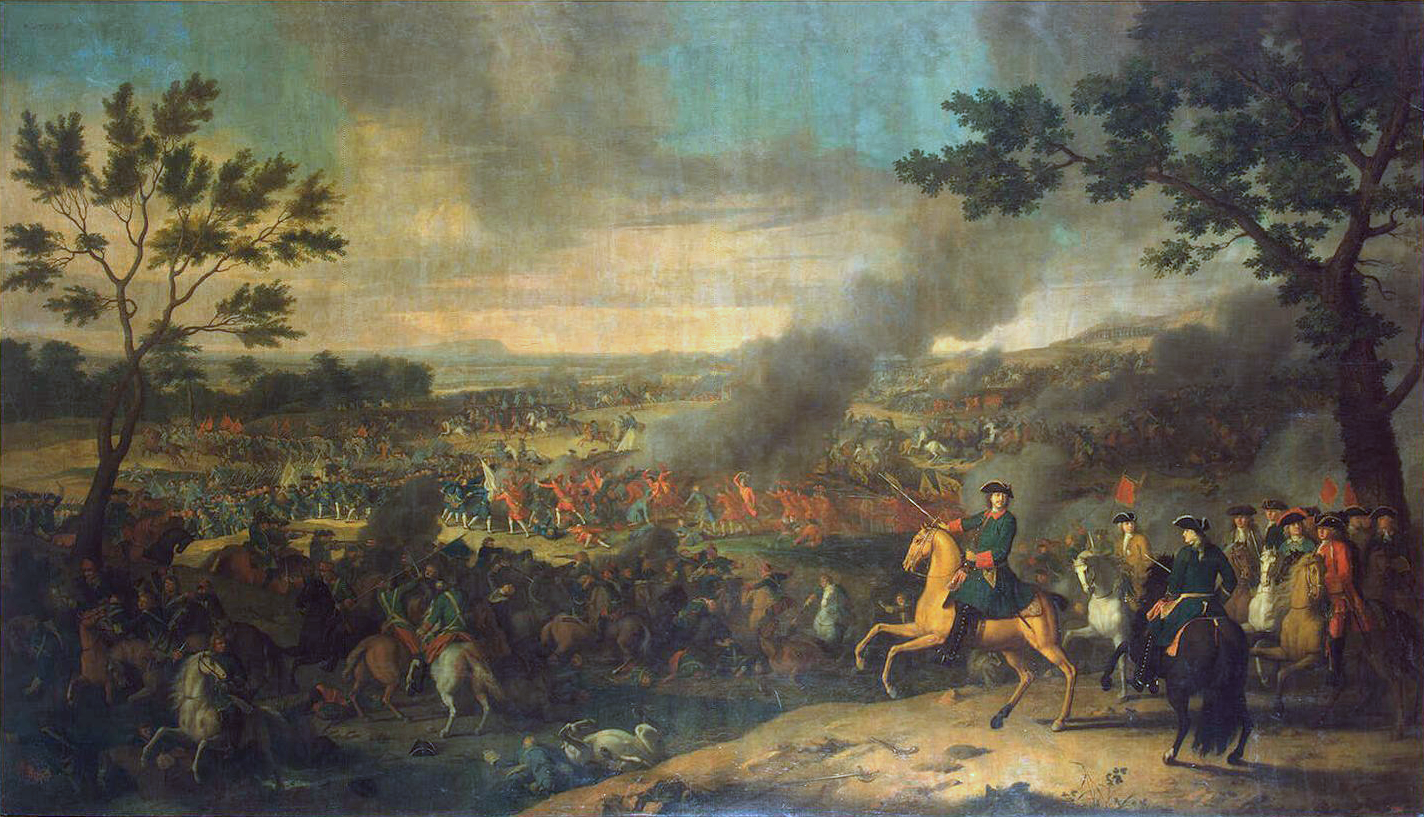
Decisive Russian victory at Poltava, 1709

The Battle of Narva dealt a severe setback to Peter the Great, but the shift of Charles XII's army to the Polish-Saxon threat soon afterward provided him with an opportunity to regroup and regain territory in the Baltic provinces. Russian victories at Erastfer and Nöteborg (Shlisselburg) provided access to Ingria in 1703, where Peter captured the Swedish fortress of Nyen, guarding the mouth of the River Neva. Thanks to General Adam Ludwig Lewenhaupt, whose outnumbered forces fended the Russians off in the battles of Gemäuerthof and Jakobstadt, Sweden was able to maintain control of most of its Baltic provinces. Before going to war, Peter had made preparations for a navy and a modern-style army, based primarily on infantry drilled in the use of firearms.

The Nyen fortress was soon abandoned and demolished by Peter, who built nearby a superior fortress as a beginning to the city of Saint Petersburg. By 1704, other fortresses were situated on the island of Kotlin and the sand flats to its south. These became known as Kronstadt and Kronslot. The Swedes attempted a raid on the Neva fort on 13 July 1704 with ships and landing armies, but the Russian fortifications held. In 1705, repeated Swedish attacks were made against Russian fortifications in the area, to little effect. A major attack on 15 July 1705 ended in the deaths of more than 500 Swedish men, or a third of its forces.

In view of continued failure to check Russian consolidation, and with declining manpower, Sweden opted to blockade Saint Petersburg in 1705. In the summer of 1706, Swedish General Georg Johan Maidel crossed the Neva with 4,000 troops and defeated an opposing Russian force, but made no move on Saint Petersburg. Later in the autumn Peter I led an army of 20,000 men in an attempt to take the Swedish town and fortress of Viborg. However, bad roads proved impassable to his heavy siege guns. The troops, who arrived on 12 October, therefore had to abandon the siege after only a few days. On 12 May 1708, a Russian galley fleet made a lightning raid on Borgå and managed to return to Kronslot just one day before the Swedish battle fleet returned to the blockade, after being delayed by unfavourable winds.

Charles spent the years 1702–06 in a prolonged struggle with Augustus II the Strong; he had already inflicted defeat on him at Riga in June 1701 and took Warsaw the following year, but trying to force a decisive defeat proved elusive. Russia left Poland in the spring of 1706, abandoning artillery but escaping from the pursuing Swedes, who stopped at Pinsk. Charles wanted not just to defeat the Commonwealth army but to depose Augustus, whom he regarded as especially treasonous, and have him replaced with someone who would be a Swedish ally, though this proved hard to achieve. The Campaign of Grodno (July 1705 – May 1706) resulted in a key Swedish victory, following by a swift Swedish invasion of Saxony in September 1706, which forced Augustus out of the war. In the treaty of Altranstädt (1706), Augustus was finally compelled to step down from the Polish throne. This was a catastrophic development for Russia, which finally agreed to give Right-bank Ukraine (which had been occupied by Left-bank Hetman Ivan Mazepa's Cossacks ever since the Paliy uprising) back to the last of his Polish allies, hoping that he would not have to face Sweden alone.

At this point, in 1707, Peter offered to return everything he had so far occupied (essentially Ingria) except Saint Petersburg and the line of the Neva, to avoid a full-scale war, but Charles XII refused. Instead he initiated a march from Saxony to invade Russia. Though his primary goal was Moscow, the strength of his forces was sapped by the cold weather (the winter of 1708/09 being one of the most severe in modern European history) and Peter's use of scorched earth tactics. When the main army turned south to recover in Ukraine, the second army with supplies and reinforcements was intercepted and routed at Lesnaya—and so were the supplies and reinforcements of Swedish ally Ivan Mazepa in Baturyn. Charles was crushingly defeated by a larger Russian force under Peter in the Battle of Poltava and fled to the Ottoman Empire while the remains of his army surrendered at Perevolochna.

In August 1708, a Swedish army of 12,000 men under General Georg Henrik Lybecker attacked Ingria, crossing the Neva from the north. They met stubborn resistance, ran out of supplies and, after reaching the Gulf of Finland west of Kronstadt, had to be evacuated by sea between 10 and 17 October. Over 11,000 men were evacuated but more than 5000 horses were slaughtered, which crippled the mobility and offensive capability of the Swedish army in Finland for several years. Peter I took advantage of this by redeploying a large number of men from Ingria to Ukraine.

This shattering defeat in 1709 did not end the war, although it decided it. Denmark and Saxony joined the war again and Augustus the Strong, through the politics of Boris Kurakin, regained the Polish throne. Peter continued his campaigns in the Baltics, and eventually he built up a powerful navy. In 1710 the Russian forces captured Riga, at the time the most populated city in the Swedish realm, and Tallinn, evicting the Swedes from the Baltic provinces, now integrated in the Russian Tsardom by the capitulation of Estonia and Livonia.

== Formation of a new anti-Swedish alliance ==
After Poltava, Peter the Great and Augustus the Strong allied again in the Treaty of Thorn (1709); Frederick IV of Denmark–Norway with Augustus the Strong in the Treaty of Dresden (1709); and Russia with Denmark–Norway in the subsequent Treaty of Copenhagen. In the Treaty of Hanover (1710), Hanover, whose elector was to become George I of Great Britain, allied with Russia. In 1713, Brandenburg-Prussia allied with Russia in the Treaty of Schwedt. George I of Great Britain and Hanover concluded three alliances in 1715: the Treaty of Berlin with Denmark–Norway, the Treaty of Stettin with Brandenburg-Prussia, and the Treaty of Greifswald with Russia.

== 1709–1714: Ottoman Empire ==
When his army surrendered, Charles XII of Sweden and a few soldiers escaped to Ottoman territory, founding a colony in front of Bender, Moldova. Peter I demanded Charles's eviction, and when the sultan refused, Peter decided to force it by invading the Ottoman Empire. The ensuing Pruth River Campaign resulted in a disaster for the Russians as Peter's army was trapped by an Ottoman army at the Pruth river. However, Peter managed to negotiate a retreat, making a few territorial concessions and promising to withdraw his forces from the Holy Roman Empire as well as allowing Charles's return to Sweden. These terms were laid out in the Treaty of Adrianople (1713). Charles showed no interest in returning, established a provisional court in his colony, and sought to persuade the sultan to engage in an Ottoman-Swedish assault on Russia. The sultan put an end to the generous hospitality granted and had the king arrested in what became known as the "kalabalik" in 1713. Charles was then confined at Timurtash and Demotika; later he abandoned his hopes for an Ottoman front and returned to Sweden in a 14-day ride.

== 1710–1721: Finland ==
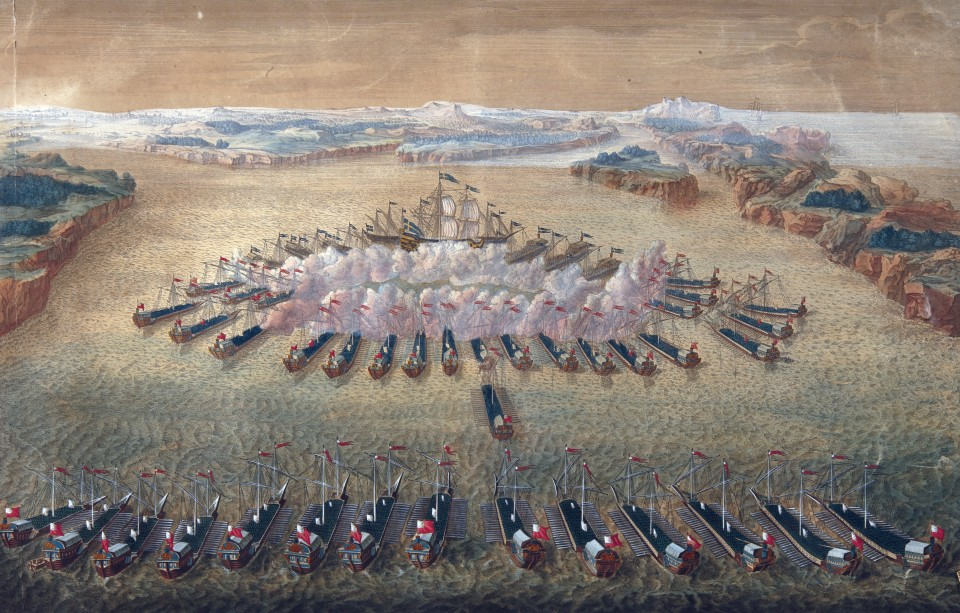
Battle of Gangut (Hanko)

The war between Russia and Sweden continued after the disaster of Poltava in 1709, though the shattered Swedish continental army could provide very little help. Russia captured Viborg in 1710 and successfully held it against Swedish attempts to retake the town in 1711. In 1712 the first Russian campaign to capture Finland began under the command of General Admiral Fyodor Apraksin. Apraksin gathered an army of 15,000 men at Viborg and started the operation in late August. Swedish General Georg Henrik Lybecker chose not to face the Russians with his 7,500 men in the prepared positions close to Viborg and instead withdrew west of Kymijoki river using scorched earth tactics. Apraksin's forces reached the river but chose not to cross it and instead withdrew back to Viborg, likely due to problems in supply. Swedish efforts to maintain their defences were greatly hampered by the drain of manpower by the continental army and various garrisons around the Baltic Sea as well as by the plague outbreak that struck Finland and Sweden between 1710 and 1713, which devastated the land killing, amongst others, over half of the population of Helsingfors (Helsinki).

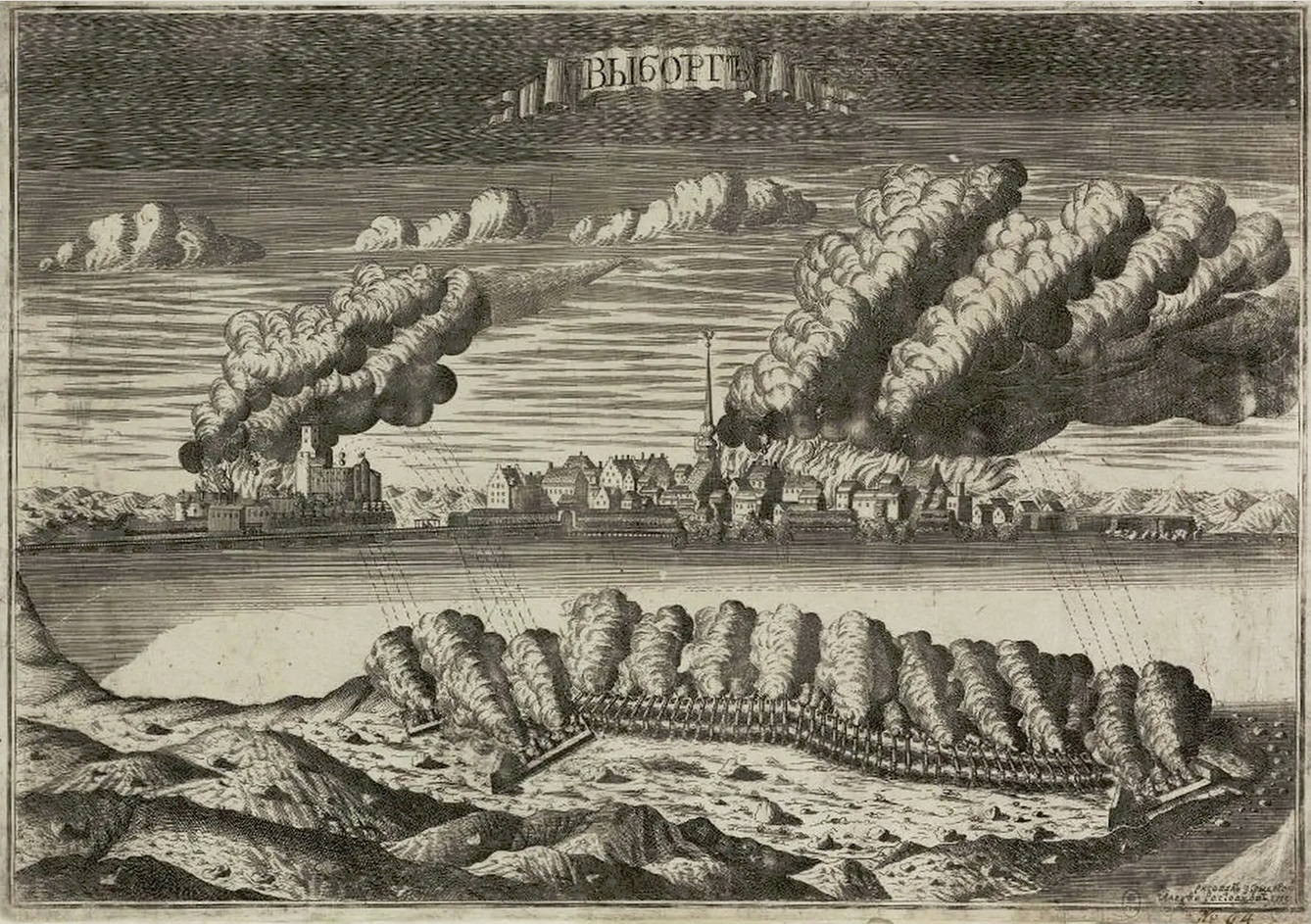
The final days of the siege of Viborg, by Alexei Rostovtsev

After the failure of 1712, Peter the Great ordered that further campaigns in war-ravaged regions of Finland with poor transportation networks were to be performed along the coastline and the seaways near the coast. Alarmed by the Russian preparations Lybecker requested naval units to be brought in as soon as possible in the spring of 1713. However, like so often, Swedish naval units arrived only after the initial Russian spring campaign had ended. Nominally under the command of Apraksin, but accompanied by Peter the Great, a fleet of coastal ships together with 12,000 men—infantry and artillery—began the campaign by sailing from Kronstadt on 2 May 1713; a further 4,000 cavalry were later sent overland to join with the army. The fleet had already arrived at Helsinki on 8 May and were met by 1,800 Swedish infantry under General Carl Gustaf Armfeldt, which started the Battle of Helsinki. Together with rowers from the ships the Russians had 20,000 men at their disposal even without the cavalry. The defenders, however, managed to fend off landing attempts by the attackers until the Russians landed at their flank at Sandviken, which forced Armfelt to retire towards Porvoo (Borgå) after setting afire both the town and all the supplies stored there as well as bridges leading north from the town. It was only on 12 May that a Swedish squadron under Admiral Erik Johan Lillie made it to Helsinki but there was nothing it could do.

The bulk of the Russian forces moved along the coast towards Borgå and the forces of Lybecker, whom Armfelt had joined. On 21–22 May 1713 a Russian force of 10,000 men landed at Pernå (Pernaja) and constructed fortifications there. Large stores of supplies and munitions were transported from Viborg and Saint Petersburg to the new base of operations. Russian cavalry managed to link up with the rest of the army there as well. Lybecker's army of 7000 infantry and 3000 cavalry avoided contact with the Russians and instead kept withdrawing further inland without even contesting the control of Borgå region or the important coastal road between Helsinki (Helsingfors) and Turku (Åbo). This also severed the contact between Swedish fleet and ground forces and prevented Swedish naval units from supplying it. Soldiers in the Swedish army fighting in Finland resented being repeatedly ordered to withdraw without even seeing the enemy. Lybecker was soon recalled to Stockholm for a hearing and Armfelt was ordered to the command of the army. Under his command the army in Finland stopped to engage the advancing Russians at Pälkäne in October 1713, where a Russian flanking manoeuvre forced him to withdraw to avoid getting encircled. The armies met again later at Napue in February 1714, where the Russians won a decisive victory.

In 1714, far greater Swedish naval assets were diverted towards Finland, which managed to cut the coastal sea route past Hangö cape already in early May 1714. This caused severe trouble for Russian supply route to Turku and beyond as supplies had to be carried overland. The Russian galley fleet arrived to the area on 29 June but stayed idle until 26–27 July when, under the leadership of Peter, Russian galleys managed to run the blockade making use of calm weather, which immobilized the Swedish battlefleet while losing only one galley of roughly 100. A small, hastily assembled Swedish coastal squadron met the Russian galley fleet west of Hangö cape in the Battle of Gangut and was overpowered by the Russians who had nearly ten-fold superiority. The Russian breach of the blockade at Hangö forced the Swedish fleet to withdraw to prevent the Russian fleet from reaching Sweden itself. The Russian Army occupied Finland mostly in 1713–1714, capturing Åland from where the population had already fled to Sweden on 13 August 1714. Since the Russian galley fleet was not able to raid the Swedish coast, with the exception of Umeå, which was plundered on 18 September, the fleet instead supported the advance of the Russian Army, which led to hastily withdrawal by the Swedish Army from Raahe (Brahestad) to Tornio (Torneå). The brutal occupation period of Finland in 1714–1721 is known as the Great Wrath.

== 1710–1716: Sweden and Northern Germany ==
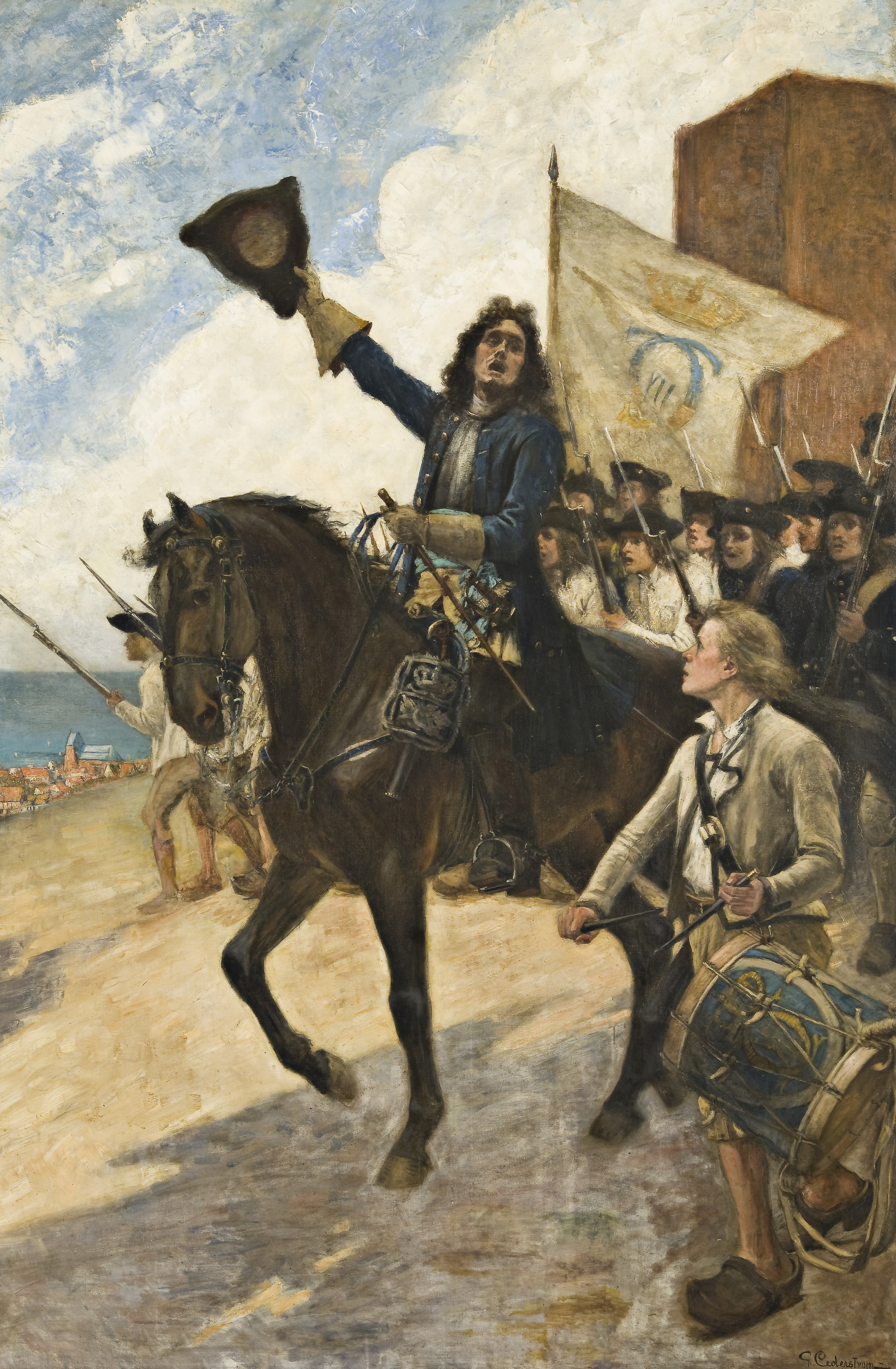
Magnus Stenbock at Helsingborg, by Gustaf Cederström (1923).

Following the Swedish defeat at Poltava in 1709, Denmark–Norway reentered the war against Sweden in late October of that year. In early November, a Danish army of 14,000 men under King Frederick IV and General Christian Ditlev Reventlow landed at Råå south of Helsingborg and occupied much of Scania, including Lund, while besieging the fortresses of Malmö and Landskrona. Unable to mount an effective defense, the Swedes under Governor-General Magnus Stenbock withdrew across the Helge River. In mid-January 1710, Reventlow broke into Blekinge; he captured Karlshamn, yet was unable to take Karlskrona due to a lack of support from Copenhagen. Having received reinforcements from Gothenburg under Christian Ludwig von Ascheberg, Stenbock was now at the head of some 16,000 men held up in Växjö. In early February, he broke camp and advanced south into Scania. Stenbock drove back Reventlow's army, forcing him to take a position southwest of Lake Ringsjön. Reventlow, who was suffering from a fever, transferred command to General Jørgen Rantzau, whereupon he decided to withdraw to Helsingborg to avoid encirclement. Stenbock pursued, encamping at Norrvidinge near Landskrona. After a council of war, Stenbock decided to attack. In the ensuing battle on 10 March, the Danes were defeated, suffering nearly 7,650 losses; in contrast, the Swedes lost about 3,000, and the Danes were forced to withdraw from Scania in mid-March.

In 1710, the Swedish army in Poland retreated to Swedish Pomerania, pursued by the coalition. In 1711, siege was laid to Stralsund. Yet the town could not be taken due to the arrival of a Swedish relief army, led by general Magnus Stenbock, which secured the Pomeranian pocket before turning west to defeat an allied army in the Battle of Gadebusch. Pursued by coalition forces, Stenbock and his army was trapped and surrendered during the Siege of Tönning.

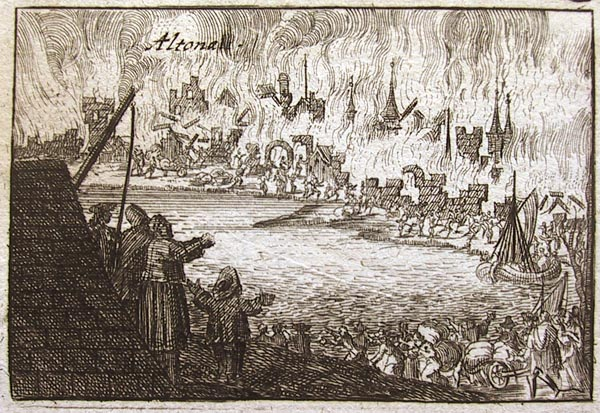
Danish town of Altona burned down by Magnus Stenbock in 1713. Russian forces retaliated by burning down the Swedish town of Wolgast in the same year.

Fredrick IV's resumption of the war brought several plans to use Norway as a staging ground for a land invasion of Sweden proper. The intention was to repeat the successful Norwegian offensives of the Gyldenløve War a generation earlier, during which Norwegian forces had overrun much of Bohuslän, captured Uddevalla and Vänersborg, and conducted simultaneous operations towards Jämtland. The planned invasion, however, was delayed until August 1711, when a Norwegian army of some 7,000 men under General Woldemar Løvendal crossed the Svinesund and invaded Bohuslän, advancing on Herrestad. Swedish general Jacob Burensköld, however, held a strong position at Uddevalla with 5,300 men, and the siege ultimately had to be abandoned after the expected naval support – essential for sustaining the army's supply line – got diverted to the Baltic, forcing a withdrawal

In 1714, Charles XII returned from the Ottoman Empire, arriving in Stralsund in November. In nearby Greifswald, already lost to Sweden, Russian tsar Peter the Great and British king George I, in his position as Elector of Hanover, had just signed an alliance on 17 (OS)/28 (NS) October. Previously a formally neutral party in the Pomeranian campaigns, Brandenburg-Prussia openly joined the coalition by declaring war on Sweden in the summer of 1715. Charles was then at war with much of Northern Europe, and Stralsund was doomed. Charles remained there until December 1715, escaping only days before Stralsund fell. When Wismar surrendered in 1716, all of Sweden's Baltic and German possessions were lost.

Plans to carry the war onto Swedish soil via a combined landing at Scania matured rapidly in the spring of 1716, fueled by reports of Norwegian successes against Charles XII’s western offensive, which he had launched upon his return to Sweden. By mid-September, a joint force of 30,000 Russians and 23,000 Danes had massed around Copenhagen for the crossing, supported by a formidable fleet anchored in the Sound.

Yet the assembled force concealed a widening strategic divergence. Frederick IV no longer made the recovery of eastern Scania his principal object. His overriding concern was maintaining Norway, as it sustained his kingdom's maritime trade and naval power; but as Charles XII’s Norwegian Campaign continued to founder, that danger receded, allowing the Dano-Norwegian king to limit the descent to securing western Scania and pressing his claims to the ancient Norwegian territories of Bohuslän, Jämtland, and Halland, while checking Russian ambitions for predominance in the Baltic. Peter I still envisaged carrying the war deeper into Sweden, destroying the fleet at Karlskrona, and securing Russia’s conquests in Ingria, Karelia, Estonia, and Livonia. Danish delays consequently consumed the remaining season for sustaining such an advance from local resources. The absence of Norwegian regiments further troubled him. Russian assessments regarded them as Frederick’s best troops, but their continued operations against Charles in Norway left Peter dependent upon the mercenary-heavy Danish Army whose reliability was doubted. Two days before the intended descent, he withdrew the Russian contingent, and the invasion was abandoned.

== 1715–1721: Intervention of the Maritime Powers ==
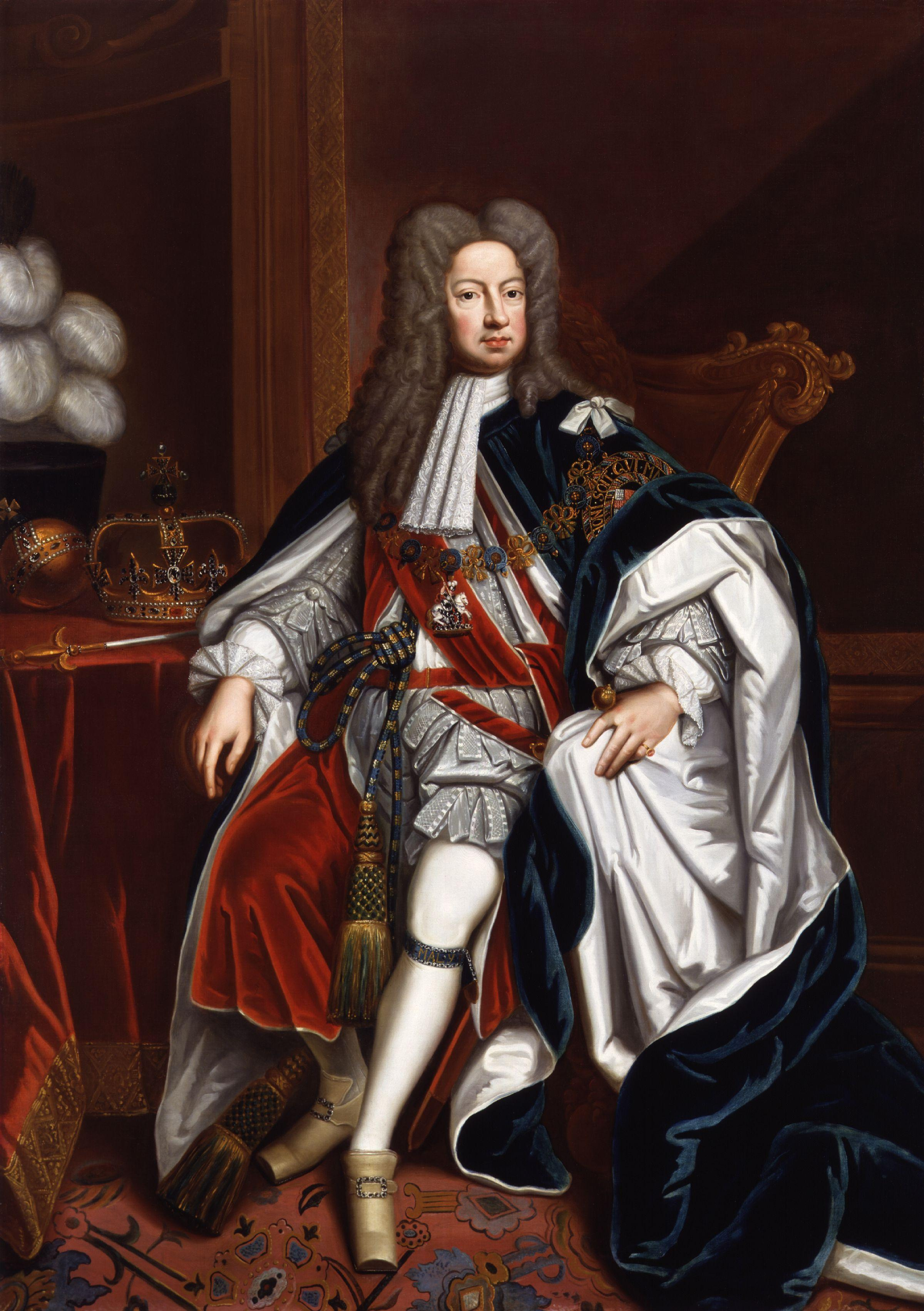
George I, king of Great Britain and elector of Hanover

As Sweden prohibited all merchants from trading with Swedish ports under Russian occupation, 107 merchant ships of varying nationalities were seized by Swedish privateers between 1710 and June 1714. The resulting damage to international trade led the Dutch and British navies to send a squadron each into the Baltic Sea in 1715 to protect their merchant fleets; George I's pro-war lobby also hoped this would draw Britain into an open conflict with Sweden in the defence of Hanoverian interests. Charles XII ordered Swedish privateers to avoid engaging the Dutch and British squadrons, allowing their merchantmen as well as three ships of the line purchased by Russia safe passage. The British and Dutch squadrons returned to safe ports for winter, except for eight British warships that were left to operate in concert with the Danes until the fall of Stralsund. Their squadrons returned in 1716 with instructions to defend Danish Zealand from Swedish attacks and protect the planned allied invasion of Scania. The British squadron, in conjunction with Russian and Danish ships, initiated a loose blockade of the Swedish Karlskrona Naval Base, while the Dutch escorted friendly merchantmen. However, the invasion was cancelled due to rising distrust among the allies, and because Peter I considered it to be too late in the year and the Swedish defences as too formidable.

The continued Swedish threat, including Sweden's support for the Jacobite cause, prompted an even more aggressive stance from Britain in 1717, (Note: According to Frost, Britain officially declared war on Sweden in 1717. Grainger, on the other hand, states that Britain merely engaged in an undeclared war with Sweden.) which proclaimed a prohibition on Swedish trade. A British fleet of 36 warships (25 of which were ships of the line) under Admiral George Byng was sent in April with instructions to capture or destroy any Swedish ships they encountered and to enforce a blockade of Swedish-controlled ports; the Dutch avoided becoming involved in these operations as to not risk their trade. The Swedish navy was driven into and blockaded at the ports of Gothenburg and Karlskrona, whose formidable defenses deterred the allies from a direct attack. Numerous Swedish privateers were captured, as was a large Swedish frigate by two British ships. The allies also made unsuccessful attempts to prevent trade between Sweden and Danzig, Lübeck and other neutral German ports. Charles XII, who did not wish to become involved in an open war with Britain, left Byng's fleet out on a limb by not responding to the attacks and blockades; with mounting operational costs, it was quickly reduced in size and eventually returned home by November. The following year, a British squadron of 10 warships was sent under John Norris into the Baltic, which once again blockaded Swedish ports.

When Charles XII was killed in Norway in November 1718, bringing an abrupt end to any peace talks with Russia, his successor Ulrika Eleonora began negotiations with Britain in a search for allies. By now, the view of Russia as an aggressive and expansive naval power had grown stronger in the British Parliament. Sweden revoked the decree that allowed Swedish privateers to attack merchantmen, while Britain ceased its blockade of Swedish ports. With the Treaties of Stockholm, the two nations returned to the terms of the friendship pact of 1700. Over the next years, British squadrons once again sailed into the Baltic, now with instructions to work alongside the Swedish navy to defend its coast and encourage Russia to negotiate; in 1719, the British Baltic Squadron included 17 ships of the line and several smaller vessels. Russia and Britain came close to open war, but their commerce continued until peace between Russia and Sweden was finally signed in 1721.

== 1716–1718: Norway ==
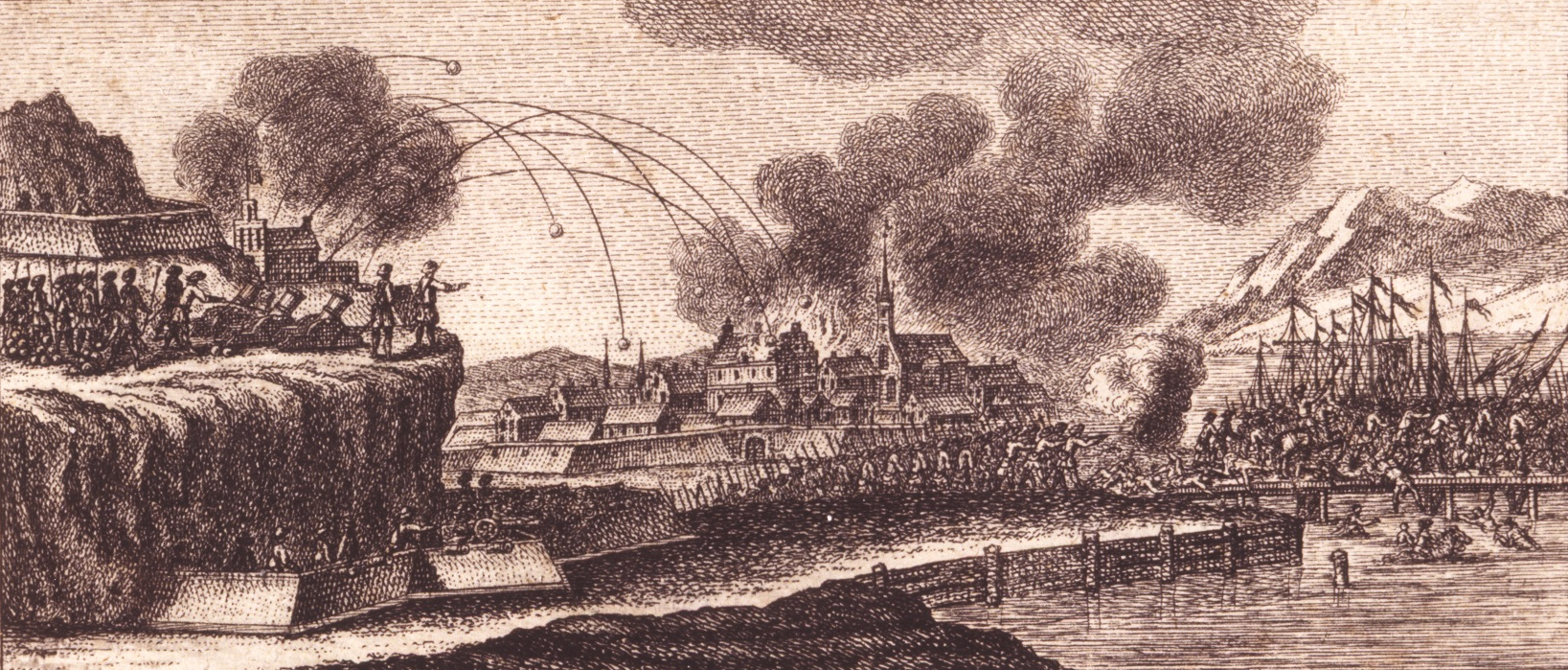
The burning of Halden in 1716, when its inhabitants set the town ablaze to expose the Swedish troops to Norwegian artillery.

After Charles XII had returned from the Ottoman Empire and resumed personal control of the war effort, he initiated two Norwegian Campaigns, starting in February 1716, to force Denmark–Norway into a separate peace treaty. Furthermore, he attempted to bar Great Britain access to the Baltic Sea. In search for allies, Charles XII also negotiated with British Jacobites. The Norwegian campaigns were halted and the army withdrawn when Charles XII was shot dead while besieging Norwegian Fredriksten on 30 November 1718 (OS). He was succeeded by his sister, Ulrika Eleonora.

== 1719–1721: Sweden ==
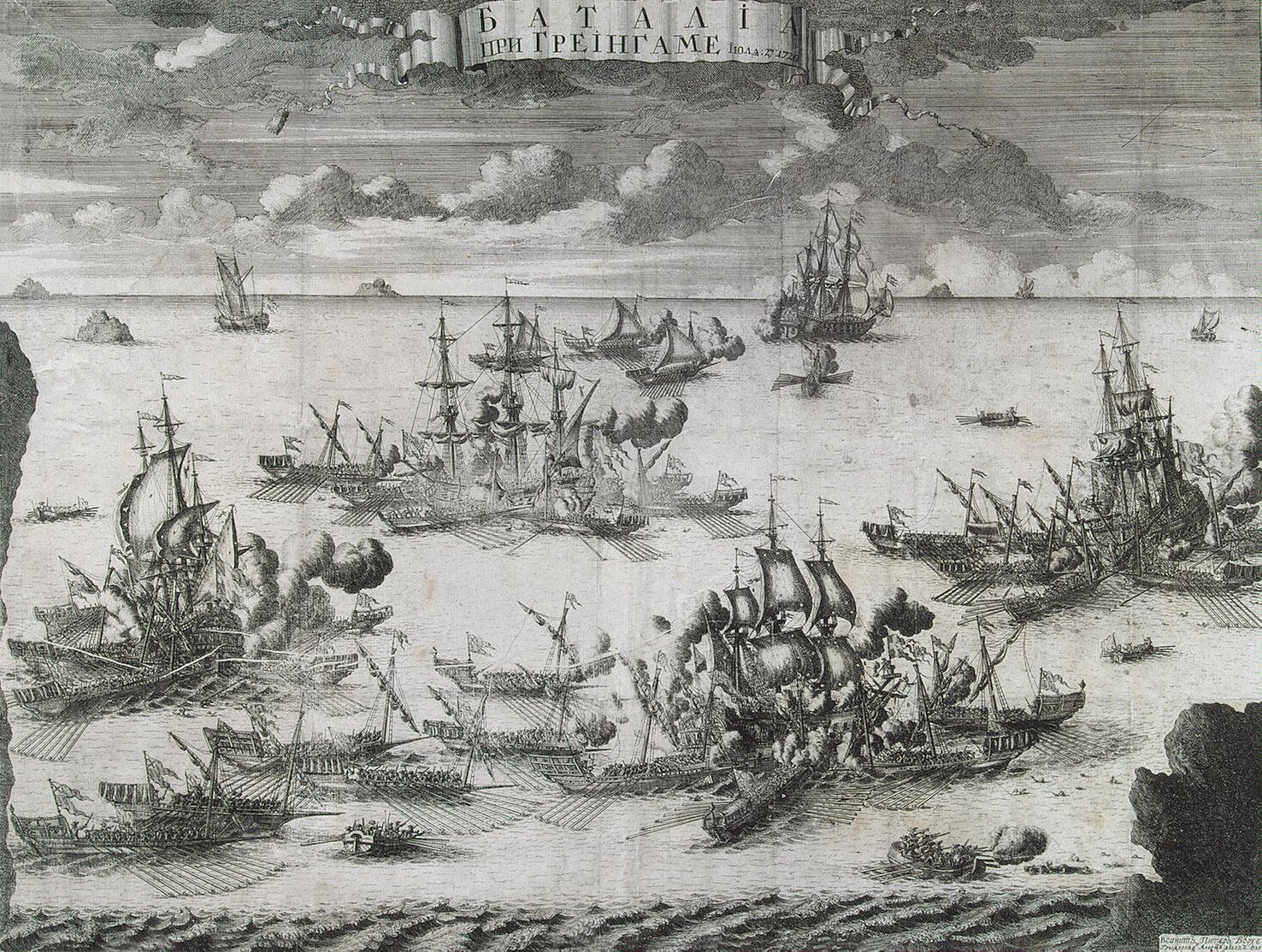
The Battle of Grengam. A 1721 etching by Alexey Zubov.

After the death of Charles XII, Sweden still refused to make peace with Russia on Peter's terms. Despite a continued Swedish naval presence and strong patrols to protect the coast, small Russian raids took place in 1716 at Öregrund, while in July 1717 a Russian squadron landed troops at Gotland who raided for supplies. To place pressure on Sweden, Russia sent a large fleet to the Swedish east coast in July 1719. There, under protection of the Russian battlefleet, the Russian galley fleet was split into three groups. One group headed for the coast of Uppland, the second to the vicinity of Stockholm, and the last to coast of Södermanland. Together they carried a landing force of nearly 30,000 men. Raiding continued for a month and devastated amongst others the towns of Norrtälje, Södertälje, Nyköping, and Norrköping, and almost all the buildings in the archipelago of Stockholm were burned. A smaller Russian force advanced on the Swedish capital but was stopped at the Battle of Stäket on 13 August. Swedish and British fleets, now allied with Sweden, sailed from the west coast of Sweden but failed to catch the raiders.

In 1719, Frederick IV assembled 35,000 men for a second invasion of Bohuslän. The Swedish army stationed there, under Field Marshal Rehnskiöld, consisted of some 10,000 men. The Dano-Norwegian land advance stalled, but Admiral Tordenskjold captured Marstrand and the fortress of Carlsten, while his later attack on New Älvsborg failed. Soon, an armistice was signed with Sweden, and peace was concluded the following year at Frederiksborg.

After the Treaty of Frederiksborg in early 1720, Sweden was no longer at war with Denmark, which allowed more forces to be placed against the Russians. This did not prevent Russian galleys from raiding the town of Umeå once again. Later, in July 1720, a squadron from the Swedish battlefleet engaged the Russian galley fleet in the Battle of Grengam. While the result of the battle is contested, it ended Russian galley raids in 1720. As negotiations for peace did not progress, the Russian galleys were once again sent to raid the Swedish coast in 1721, targeting primarily the Swedish coast between Gävle and Piteå. The last battle of the war took place at Selånger in May.

== Peace ==
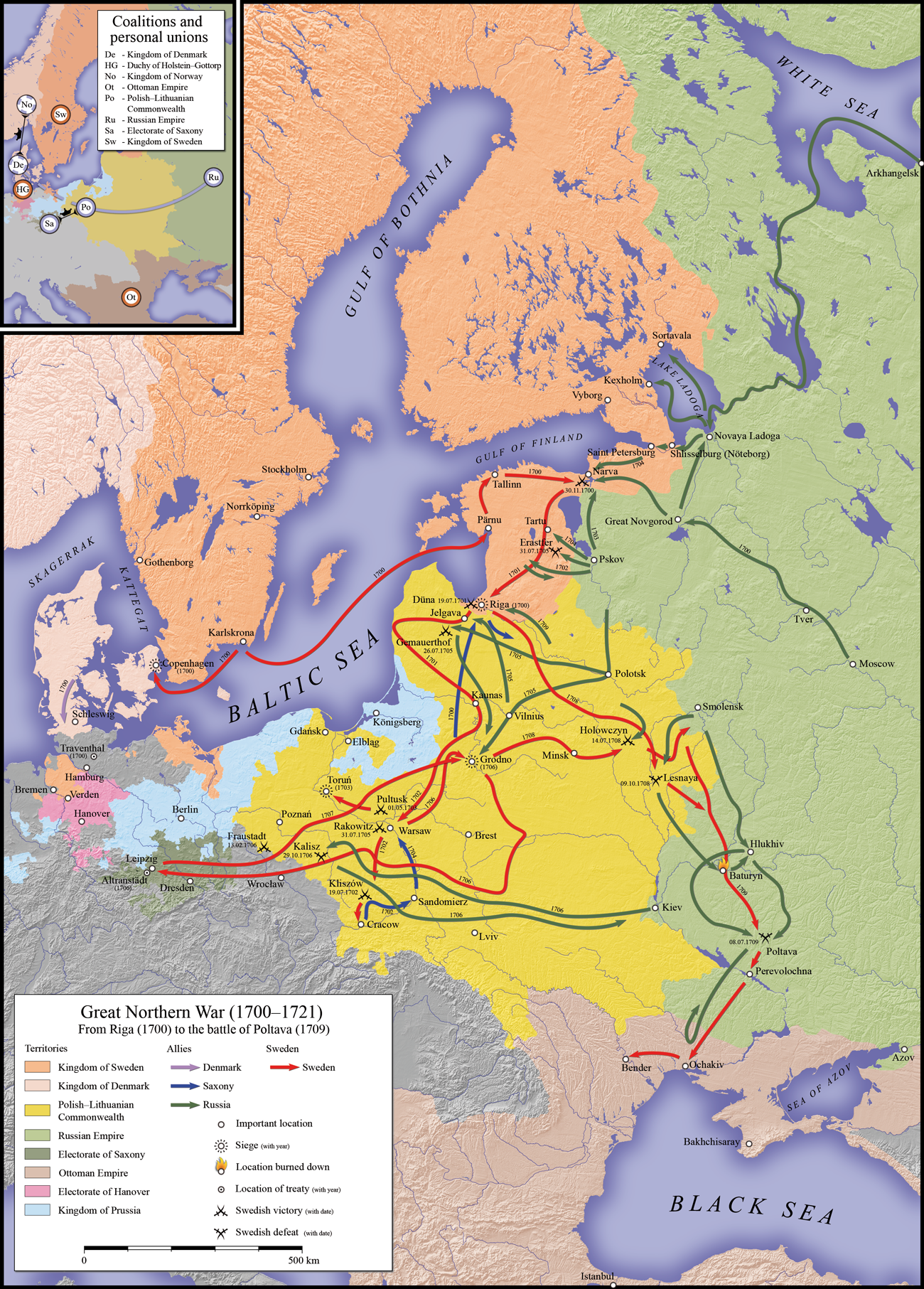
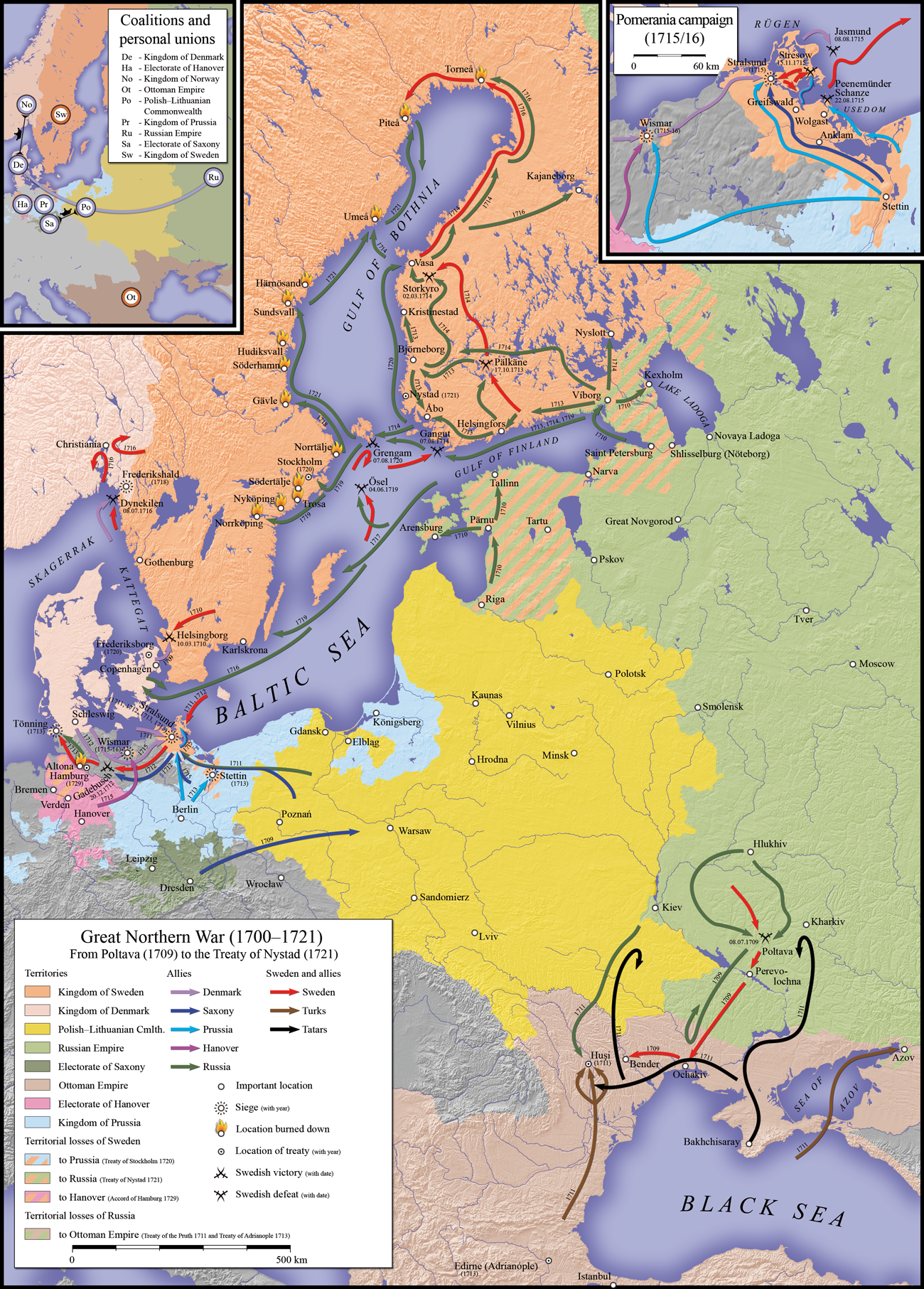
Campaigns and territorial changes 1700–1709 (left) and 1709–1721 (right)

By the time of Charles XII's death, the anti-Swedish allies became increasingly divided on how to fill the power gap left behind by the defeated and retreating Swedish armies. George I and Frederik IV both coveted hegemony in northern Germany, while Augustus the Strong was concerned about the ambitions of Frederick William I on the southeastern Baltic coast. Peter the Great, whose forces were spread all around the Baltic Sea, envisioned hegemony in East Central Europe and sought to establish naval bases as far west as Mecklenburg. In January 1719, George I, Augustus and emperor Charles VI concluded a treaty in Vienna aimed at reducing Russia's frontiers to the pre-war limits.

Hanover-Great Britain and Brandenburg-Prussia thereupon negotiated separate peace treaties with Sweden, the treaties of Stockholm in 1719 and early 1720, which partitioned Sweden's northern German dominions among the parties. The negotiations were mediated by French diplomats, who sought to prevent a complete collapse of Sweden's position on the southern Baltic coast and assured that Sweden was to retain Wismar and northern Swedish Pomerania. Hanover gained Swedish Bremen-Verden, while Brandenburg-Prussia incorporated southern Swedish Pomerania. In addition to the rivalries in the anti-Swedish coalition, there was an inner-Swedish rivalry between Charles Frederick, Duke of Holstein-Gottorp, and Frederick I of Hesse-Cassel for the Swedish throne. The Gottorp party succumbed and Ulrike Eleonora, wife of Frederick I, transferred power to her husband in May 1720. When peace was concluded with Denmark, the anti-Swedish coalition had already fallen apart, and Denmark was not in a military position to negotiate a return of its former eastern provinces across the sound. Frederick I was, however, willing to cede Swedish support for his rival in Holstein-Gottorp, which came under Danish control with its northern part annexed, and furthermore cede the Swedish privilege of exemption from the Sound Dues. A respective treaty was concluded in Frederiksborg in June 1720.

When Sweden finally was at peace with Hanover, Great Britain, Brandenburg-Prussia and Denmark–Norway, it hoped that the anti-Russian sentiments of the Vienna parties and France would culminate in an alliance that would restore its Russian-occupied eastern provinces. Yet, primarily due to internal conflicts in Great Britain and France, that did not happen. Therefore, the war was finally concluded by the Treaty of Nystad between Russia and Sweden in Uusikaupunki (Nystad) on 30 August 1721 (OS). Finland was returned to Sweden, while the majority of Russia's conquests (Swedish Estonia, Livonia, Ingria, Kexholm and a portion of Karelia) were ceded to the tsardom. Sweden's dissatisfaction with the result led to fruitless attempts at recovering the lost territories in the course of the following century, such as the Russo-Swedish War of 1741–1743, and the Russo-Swedish War of 1788–1790.

Saxe-Poland-Lithuania and Sweden did not conclude a formal peace treaty; instead, they renewed the Peace of Oliva that had ended the Second Northern War in 1660.

Sweden had lost almost all of its "overseas" holdings gained in the 17th century and ceased to be a major power. Russia gained its Baltic territories and became one of the great powers of Europe.

== See also ==
- Caroleans
- International relations (1648–1814)
- List of battles of the Great Northern War
- Military of the Swedish Empire
- Swedish Army
