= Treaty of Vienna (1719) =

1719 treaty during the Great Northern War

The Treaty of Vienna was signed on 5 January 1719 during the Great Northern War and War of Quadruple Alliance, between the Holy Roman Empire, the Kingdom of Great Britain, and the Electorate of Saxony. Its aim was 'to secure the peace and tranquility of the Empire' and act as a defensive alliance. The treaty was intended to check the Tsardom of Russia, prevent it from making a separate peace with Swedish Empire, and compel the evacuation of Russian troops stationed in Poland-Lithuania. The treaty successfully created distrust between Peter I of Russia and Frederick William I of Prussia, leading to the Russians evacuating Poland-Lithuania in July 1719.

== Sources ==
=== Bibliography ===
- Lewitter, Lucjan Ryszard (1970). "Poland, Russia and the Treaty of Vienna of 5 January 1719". The Historical Journal. 13 (1): 3–30. JSTOR 2637820.
- Frost, Robert I. (2000). The Northern Wars. Edinburgh: Longman. ISBN 9780582064294.
