= Norrvidinge Church =

- Norrvidinge kyrka
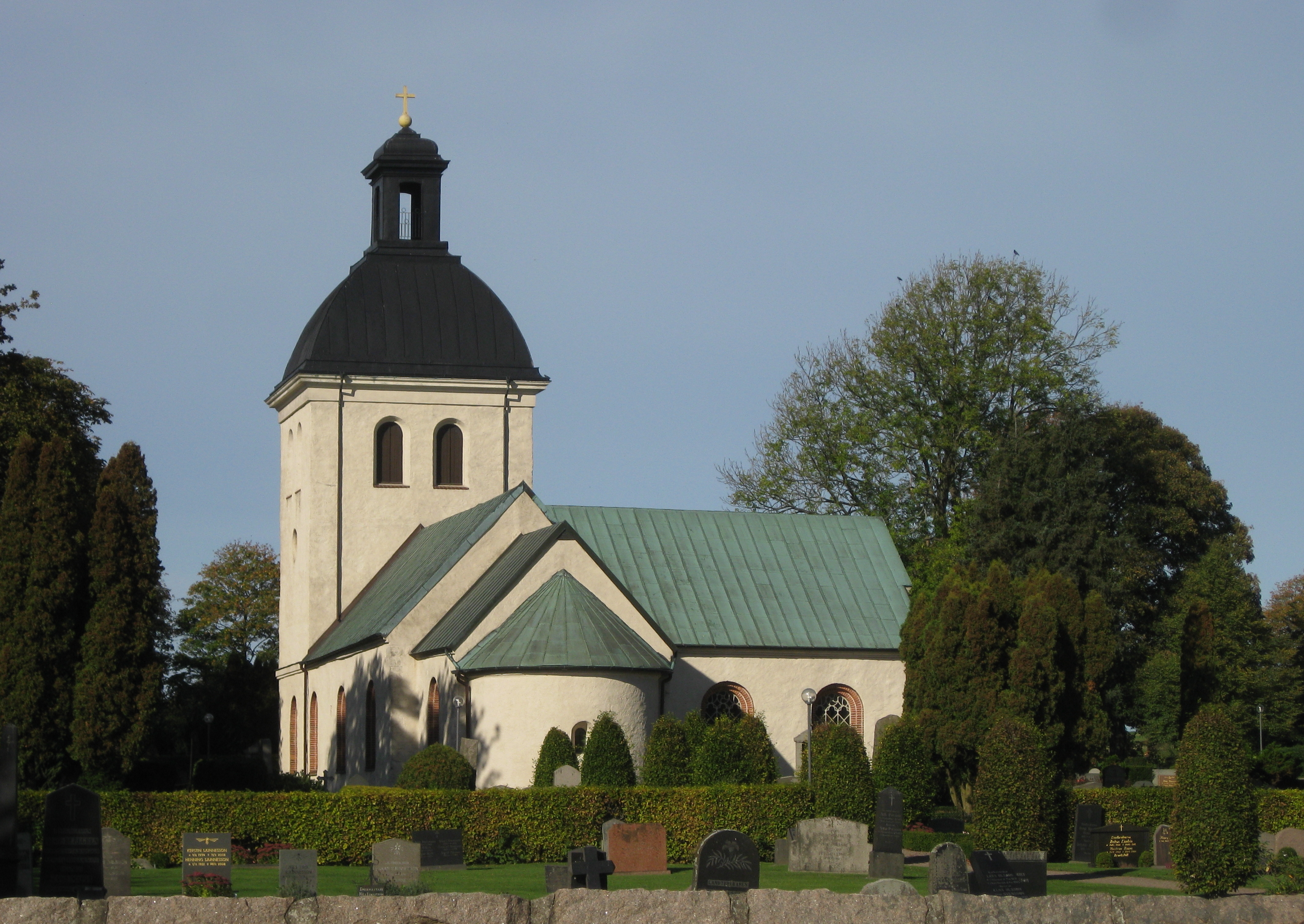
- Norrvidinge Church

- 55°50′18″N 13°05′51″E
- Country: Sweden
- Denomination: Church of Sweden

Norrvidinge Church (Swedish: Norrvidinge kyrka) is a medieval church in Norrvidinge (Svalöv Municipality) in the province of Scania, Sweden. It dates from the 12th century but was preceded by a stave church. Norrvidinge Church contains medieval murals. Most of the furnishings date from after the Reformation, with the exception of the rood cross and the baptismal font.

== History and architecture ==
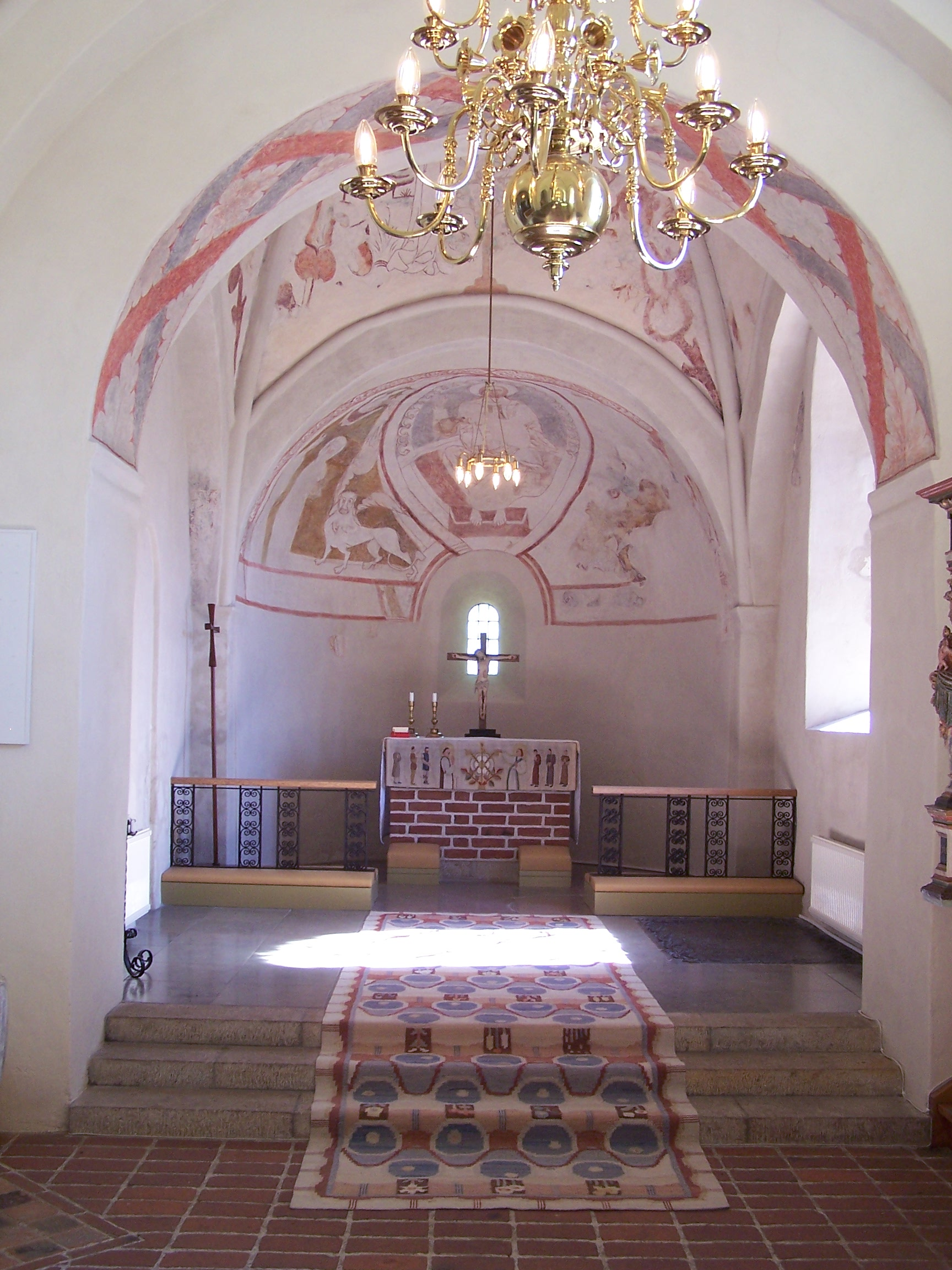
View of the choir, with its medieval murals

The church in Norrvidinge was built towards the end of the 12th century, but was preceded by a wooden stave church. The wooden church was built at the end of the 11th century, according to dendrochronological examinations of a plank which has been recovered from the church.

The current, stone church originally consisted of a nave, choir and an apse. It was built of fieldstone, with the corners more finely hewn from sandstone. During the 13th century a round tower was built, and in the following century the interior was remade and new vaults constructed. A substantial enlargement was made in 1783, when the nave was expanded towards the west. A northern transept arm was added in 1822. The current tower was built in 1854. A major renovation was carried out in 1869, when the current windows of the church were installed.

== Furnishings and murals ==
Among the church furnishings, the baptismal font is the oldest and dates from the period of the construction of the stone church. The rood cross is from the late 15th century. The decorated pulpit is from the late 17th century, and the church also has an altarpiece from 1743, which incorporates parts of an earlier altarpiece.

The apse is decorated with a mural from the 13th century depicting Christ in Majesty. Decorative murals from the 14th and 15th centuries also decorate the choir vaults; those from the 15th century depict scenes from Genesis.
