= Baumanskaya =

Baumanskaya:

- Baumanskaya (Moscow Metro)
- Baumanskaya (street)
- Bauman Street, Kazan

== See also ==
- Bauman Garden
- Bauman Lane
