= Mikhail Mikhailovich Golitsyn =

Mikhail Mikhailovich Golitsyn may refer to:

- Mikhail Mikhailovich Golitsyn (field marshal) (1675–1730), Russian field marshal and president of the College of War
- Mikhail Mikhailovich Golitsyn (admiral) (1684–1764), his brother, Russian admiral and diplomat
