= Alexander Golitsyn =

Alexander Golitsyn or Alexander Golitzen may refer to:

- Alexander Golitzin (bishop) (born 1948), Eastern Orthodox Archbishop
- Alexander Golitzen (1908–2005), movie art director
- Alexander Mikhailovich Golitsyn (1718–1783), Russian field marshal and governor of Saint Petersburg
- Alexander Mikhailovich Golitsyn (vice chancellor) (1723–1804), son of general admiral Mikhail Mikhailovich Golitsyn
- Prince Alexander Nikolaevich Golitsyn (1773–1844), minister of education under Alexander I

== See also ==
- House of Golitsyn
