= Igor Ledogorov =

Igor Ledogorov PAR
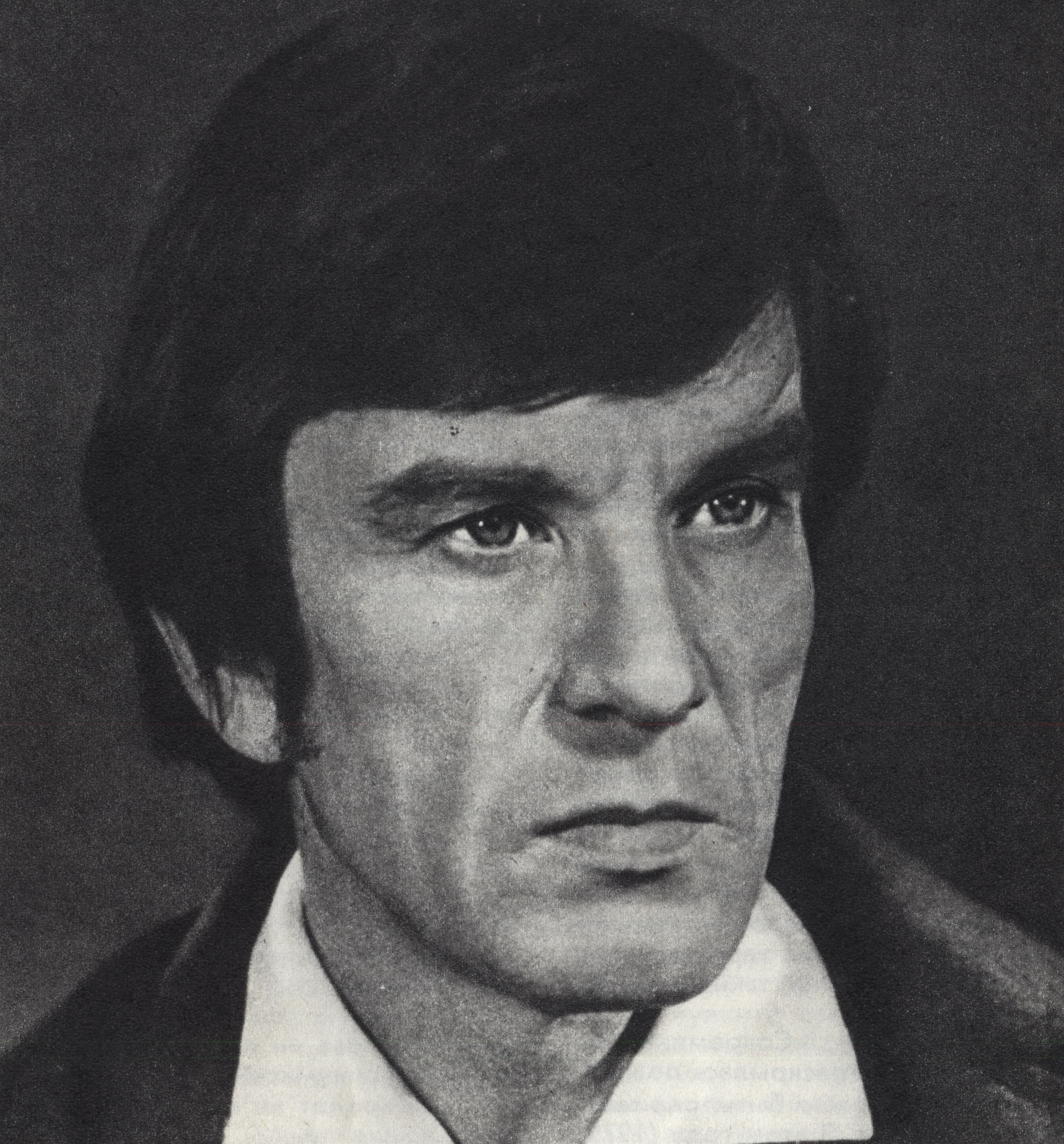
- Born: Igor Vadimovich Ledogorov; 9 May 1932; Moscow, USSR
- Died: 10 February 2005 (aged 72); Hamilton, New Zealand
- Occupation: actor
- Years active: 1964–1997
- Children: Vadim Ledogorov
- Awards: People's Artist of the RSFSR (1989)

Igor Vadimovich Ledogorov (Russian: И́горь Вади́мович Ледогоров; 9 May 1932 – 10 February 2005) was a Russian actor.

== Biography ==
Igor Ledogorov was born on 9 May 1932 at Moscow. Since the beginning of The Great Patriotic War he and his family was evacuated to Tashkent. Here he first came into contact with the world of cinema, the crowd participated in the famous picture director Leonid Lukov Two Soldiers.

In 1958, he graduated from Tashkent Polytechnic Institute, where he was a party to the collective dramatic, artistic director was Honored Artist of the RSFSR, Nikolay Khlibko. Also in Tashkent he entered the Theatre and Art Institute Alexander Ostrovsky, graduating in 1964.

The first significant work was the role of the actor Nikolay Bauman in eponymous historical-biographical film directed by Semyon Tumanov.

On 1967 to 1969 and Ledogorov played Leningrad Theater Lenin Komsomol. Then, having become acquainted with Igor Vladimirov, he moved to Тheater Lensoviet. There he spent three years playing in productions of Warsaw Melody (from Alisa Freindlich), The Road to Calvary, The Forty-First.

In 1971 Igor Ledogorov came to DATS. On the stage of this theater he performed until 1997 and, until his departure abroad.

In 1997 from the actor after his son Vadim emigrated to New Zealand.

Ledogorov died on 10 February 2005 in Hamilton. He was buried in Cambridge (Hautapu) Public Cemetery.

== Filmography ==
- 1964 — Your Тraces as Vladimir
- 1968 — Nikolay Bauman as Nikolay Bauman
- 1970 — The Ballad of Bering and His Friends as Dmitry Ovtsyn
- 1972 — Hot Snow as Osin, Colonel, Chief of Counterintelligence
- 1974 — Georgy Sedov as Georgy Sedov
- 1974 — Teens in the Universe as extraterrestrial
- 1975 — From Dawn Till Sunset as General Stukovsky
- 1976 — The Life and Death of Ferdinand Luce as Bauer
- 1977 — The Legend of Til as William the Silent
- 1977 — Portrait with Rain as Anatoly
- 1980 — Karl Marx. Die jungen Jahre as Wilhelm Weitling
- 1981 — Per Aspera Ad Astra as Ambassador Rakan
- 1977 — They Were Actors as Ryabinin
- 1982 — Tenderness to the Roaring Beast as Donat Borovsky
- 1988 — May I Die, God as film director
- 1995 — Tribunal as Chairman of the court
- 1997 — Hunting Season as Vertletsky

== Honors and awards ==
- 1974 — State Prize BSSR
- 1978 — Vasilyev Brothers State Prize of the RSFSR
- 1979 — Honored Artist of the RSFSR
- 1989 — People's Artist of the RSFSR
