= Nikolay Bauman (film) =

- Russian: Николай Бауман
- Directed by: Semyon Tumanov
- Written by: Georgy Kapralov; Semyon Tumanov
- Starring: Igor Ledogorov; Rodion Aleksandrov; Elina Bystritskaya; Igor Dmitriev; Yefim Kopelyan
- Cinematography: Georgy Kupriyanov
- Music by: Vladimir Rubin
- Production company: Mosfilm
- Release date: 1967
- Running time: 99 minutes
- Country: Soviet Union
- Language: Russian

Nikolay Bauman (Russian: Николай Бауман) is a 1967 Soviet drama film directed by Semyon Tumanov.

== Plot ==
The film tells about the revolutionary Nikolay Bauman, one of the creators of the Iskra newspaper.

== Cast ==
- Igor Ledogorov as Nikolay Bauman
- Rodion Aleksandrov as Zotov
- Elina Bystritskaya as Andreyeva
- Igor Dmitriev as Vasily Kachalov
- Yefim Kopelyan as Morozov
- Irina Miroshnichenko as Nadya
- Sergey Nikonenko as Viktor
- Natalya Surovegina as Sasha
- Natalya Velichko as Nina
- Gennadi Yukhtin as Kudryashov
- Alexander Kalyagin as Marat
- Vladimir Balon as Ilya Alexandrovich Sats
- Vadim Zakharchenko as Podzharyy
- Natalya Krachkovskaya as woman at a funeral
