= Love of Serafim Frolov =

- Любовь Серафима Фролова
- Directed by: Semyon Tumanov
- Starring: Leonid Kuravlyov; Tamara Syomina; Larisa Luzhina; Gennadi Yukhtin
- Music by: Vladimir Rubin
- Production company: Mosfilm
- Release date: 1968
- Running time: 79 minutes
- Country: Soviet Union
- Language: Russian

Love of Serafim Frolov (Russian: Любовь Серафима Фролова, romanized: Lyubov Serafima Frolova) is a 1968 Soviet romantic drama directed by Semyon Tumanov.

== Plot ==
Soldier Serafim Frolov (Leonid Kuravlyov) returning from the front after the War, decided to go to the girl Nastya (Tamara Syomina), whom he had known only through correspondence. However, Nastya does not want him, because she can't forget her fiancée, who died at the front. Serafim decides to leave, but then he returns, hoping that Nastya loves him. He gets a job in the same village, he meets a nurse Anfisa, who returned from the front (Larisa Luzhina), and he helps to a Maria, mother of many children (Zhanna Prokhorenko). Anfisa, which husband is cheating on her, clearly shows to Serafim, that she likes him, but Serafim likes Maria: he believes that she needs his help. So, without obtaining reciprocity from Nasty, Serafim goes to Maria. Maria makes it clear that for Serafim it is better to go back to the Nastya. Serafim returns to her, and Nastya happily greets him.

== Cast ==
- Leonid Kuravlyov as Serafim Frolov
- Tamara Syomina as Nastya
- Larisa Luzhina as Anfisa
- Gennadi Yukhtin as Anfisa's husband
- Pavel Shprigfelt as Nastya's grandfather
- Zhanna Prokhorenko as Maria
- Alexandra Denisova as apartment owner
- Alexander Kavalerov as Sashka
- Nikolay Khlibko (episode)

== Film credits ==
- Director: Semyon Tumanov
- Screenwriter: Nikolay Evdokimov
- Composer: Vladimir Rubin
- Costumier: Georgy Turilev
