= Mikhail Mikhailovich Golitsyn (admiral) =

Russian admiral

Prince Mikhail Mikhailovich Golitsyn
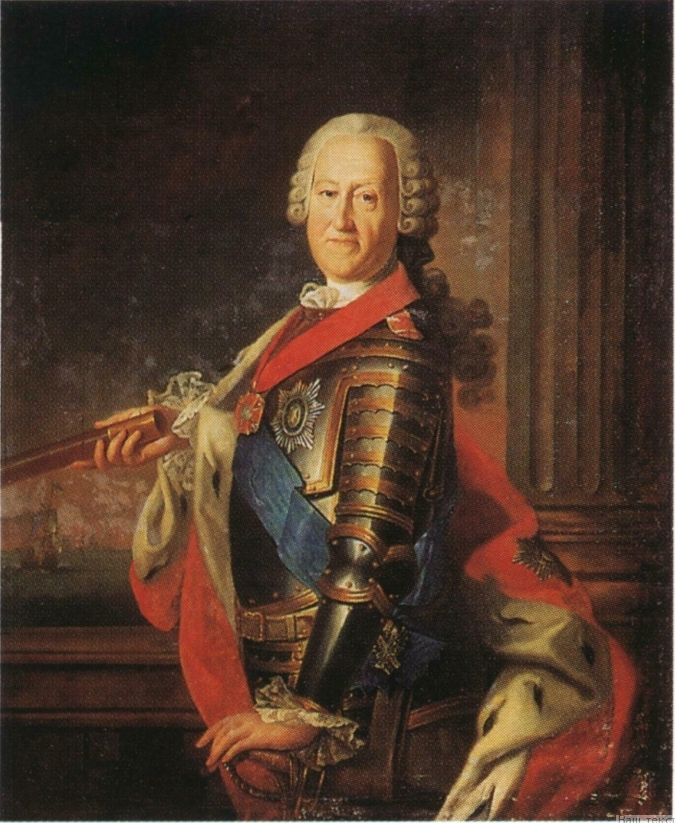
- Golitsyn by Christinek, c. 1763

Russian consul to Afsharid Iran
- In office 1745–1748
- Monarch: Elizabeth of Russia
- Preceded by: Vasily Bratishchev
- Succeeded by: Ivan Danilov

Personal details
- Born: 1 November 1684 Moscow, Tsardom of Russia
- Died: 25 March 1764 (aged 79) Moscow, Russian Empire
- Resting place: Epiphany Monastery
- Spouses: Maria Dmitrievna Golovina; Tatiana Kirillovna Naryshkyna
- Awards: Order of St. Andrew; Order of St. Alexander Nevsky

Military service
- Allegiance: Russian Empire
- Branch/service: Imperial Russian Navy
- Years of service: 1703–1762
- Rank: Admiral-general
- Battles/wars: Great Northern War; Battle of Grengam

Prince Mikhail Mikhailovitch Golitsyn or Galitzin (Russian: Михаи́л Миха́йлович Голи́цын) (1 November 1684 – 25 March 1764) was a Russian admiral and diplomat.

== Biography ==
Born in Moscow, he was the youngest son of Mikhail Andreyevich Golitsyn and his wife, Prascovia Nikitichna Kaftyriova.

In 1703 he began a career in the Imperial Russian Navy. From 1708 to 1717 he studied seamanship in the Netherlands and the United Kingdom. In 1717 he returned to Russia and participated in the Great Northern War, during which he distinguished himself in the Battle of Grengam, commanding a detachment of rowing fleet that defeated a Swedish squadron.

In 1726 he became an advisor to the Board of Admiralty and was made a Lieutenant commander. In 1728 he became privy councilor and senator, and in 1727 he was named president of the College of Justice. Together with his brother, also Mikhail Mikhailovitch, he participated in the events surrounding the coronation of Empress Anna Ivanovna.

In 1732 he returned to the navy with the rank of vice admiral but in 1741 Empress Elizabeth came to the throne and he was recalled to politics, again becoming a privy councilor in 1745. He was appointed ambassador to Persia from 1745 to 1748, and brought peach trees back to his greenhouse, resulting in the first crop of peaches harvested in Russia.

In 1746 he was promoted to the rank of admiral, from 1748 he was commander of the Russian Navy, and in 1750 he was appointed Chairman of the Board of Admiralty. He is one of the admirals credited for the development of the Russian art of naval warfare. In December 1752, he was appointed supreme commander of Saint Petersburg, a post he held until May 1754.

In 1756, Golitsyn was elevated to the rank of admiral-general, He was the third person to hold this position, and the last one who was not a member of the royal family.

He retired in 1762 and died on 25 March 1764 in Moscow. He was buried there in the Epiphany Monastery.

== Marriages ==
=== First marriage ===
His first wife was Maria Dmitrievna Golovina (d. 1721). They had no children.

=== Second marriage ===
On January 22, 1722, he married Tatiana Kirillovna Naryshkyna (1704–1757), daughter of the governor of Moscow, Kirill Alekseyevich Naryshkin. They had eight children:

- Alexandr Mikhailovich (1723–1807)
- Ekaterina Mikhailovna (1725–1744)
- Sergei Mikhailovich (1727–1806)
- Anastasia Mikhailovna (1728–1779)
- Elizaveta Mikhailovna (1730–1795)
- Mikhail Mikhailovich (1731–1804)
- Dmitry Mikhailovich (1735–1771)
- Pyotr Mikhailovich (1738–1775)
