= The Ballad of Bering and His Friends =

1970 film

- Russian: Баллада о Беринге и его друзьях
- Directed by: Yuri Shvyryov
- Written by: Iosif Osipov; Viktor Shklovskiy; Yuri Shvyryov
- Starring: Kārlis Sebris; Igor Ledogorov; Yuri Nazarov; Valentin Nikulin; Gennadi Frolov; Leonid Kuravlyov
- Cinematography: Konstantin Arutyunov
- Music by: Bogdan Trotsyuk
- Release date: 1970
- Running time: 97 minute
- Country: Soviet Union
- Language: Russian

The Ballad of Bering and His Friends (Russian: Баллада о Беринге и его друзьях) is a 1970 Soviet adventure film directed by Yuri Shvyryov.

== Plot ==
The film tells the story of the Danish-born Russian explorer Vitus Bering, who, by decree of Peter the Great in 1725, led the First Kamchatka expedition and made new discoveries, expanding the borders of the Russian Empire.

== Cast ==
- Kārlis Sebris as Vitus Bering
- Igor Ledogorov as Dmitry Ovtsyn
- Yuri Nazarov as Aleksei Chirikov
- Valentin Nikulin as Georg Steller
- Gennadi Frolov as Starodubtsev
- Leonid Kuravlyov
- Vija Artmane as Anna Bering
- Roman Tkachuk as Tsar Peter I
- Dzidra Ritenberga as Empress Catherine I
- Nonna Mordyukova as Empress Anna Ioannovna
