= Bauman Garden (Moscow) =

Park in Moscow, Russia

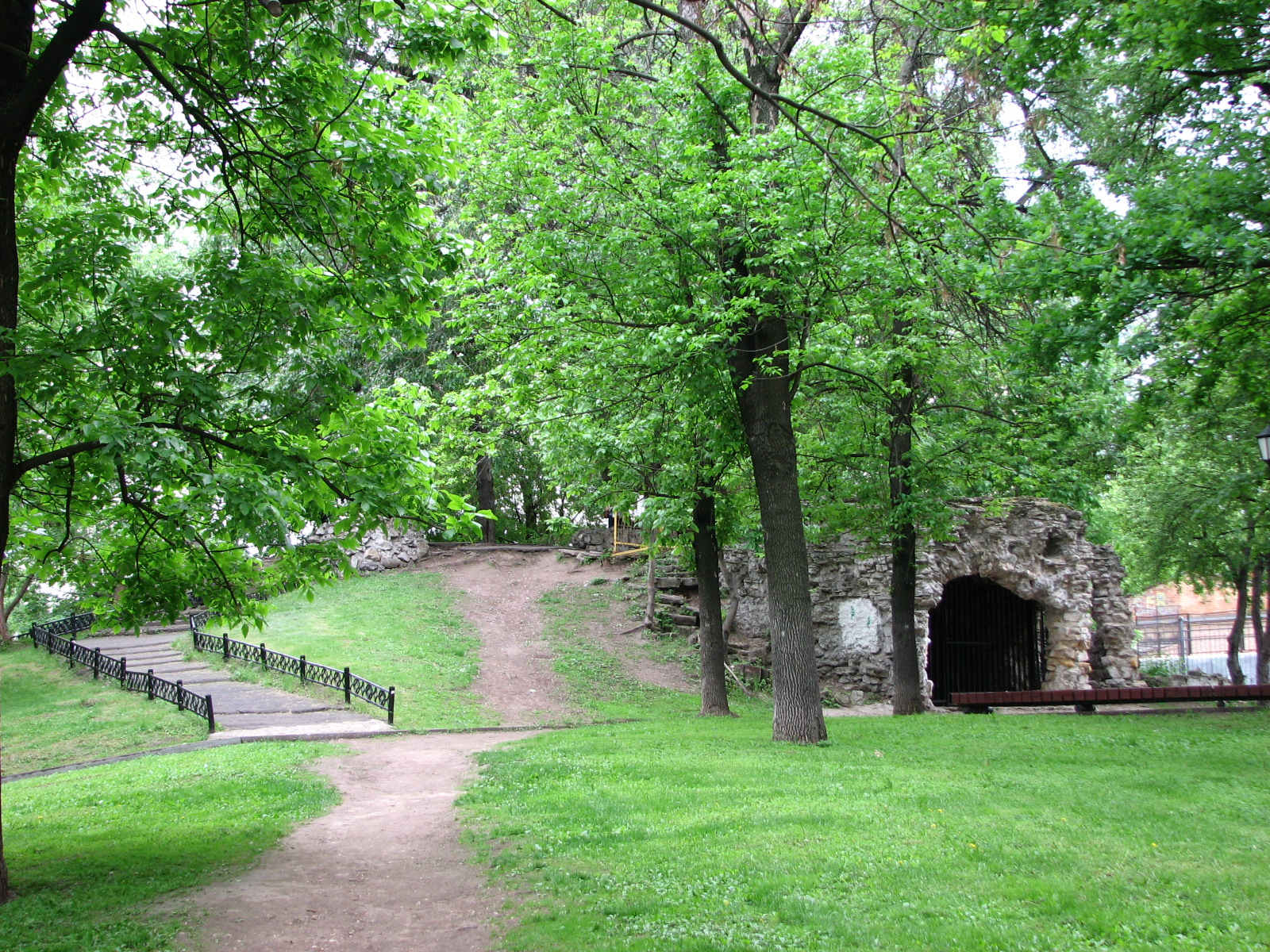
- The Belvedere grotto of the Bauman Garden, 2010
- Interactive map of Bauman Garden
- Location: Moscow, Russia
- Coordinates: 55°46′03″N 37°39′32″E
- Area: 5 hectares (12 acres)
- Open: 1920
- Public transit: Krasnye Vorota; Komsomolskaya; Baumanskaya; Kurskaya; Kurskaya
- Website: www.sadbaumana.ru

Bauman Culture and Recreation Garden (Russian: Сад и́мени Никола́я Ба́умана, previously known as the May Day Garden) is a garden and park complex located in the Basmanny District of Moscow, between Staraya Basmannaya and Novaya Basmannaya streets. Opened in 1920, the park was named after a revolutionary bolshevik, Nikolay Bauman. It included the garden of the former Golitsyn estate and territories of surrounding households. Since 1979, the garden has the status of an object of the cultural heritage of Russia.

== History ==
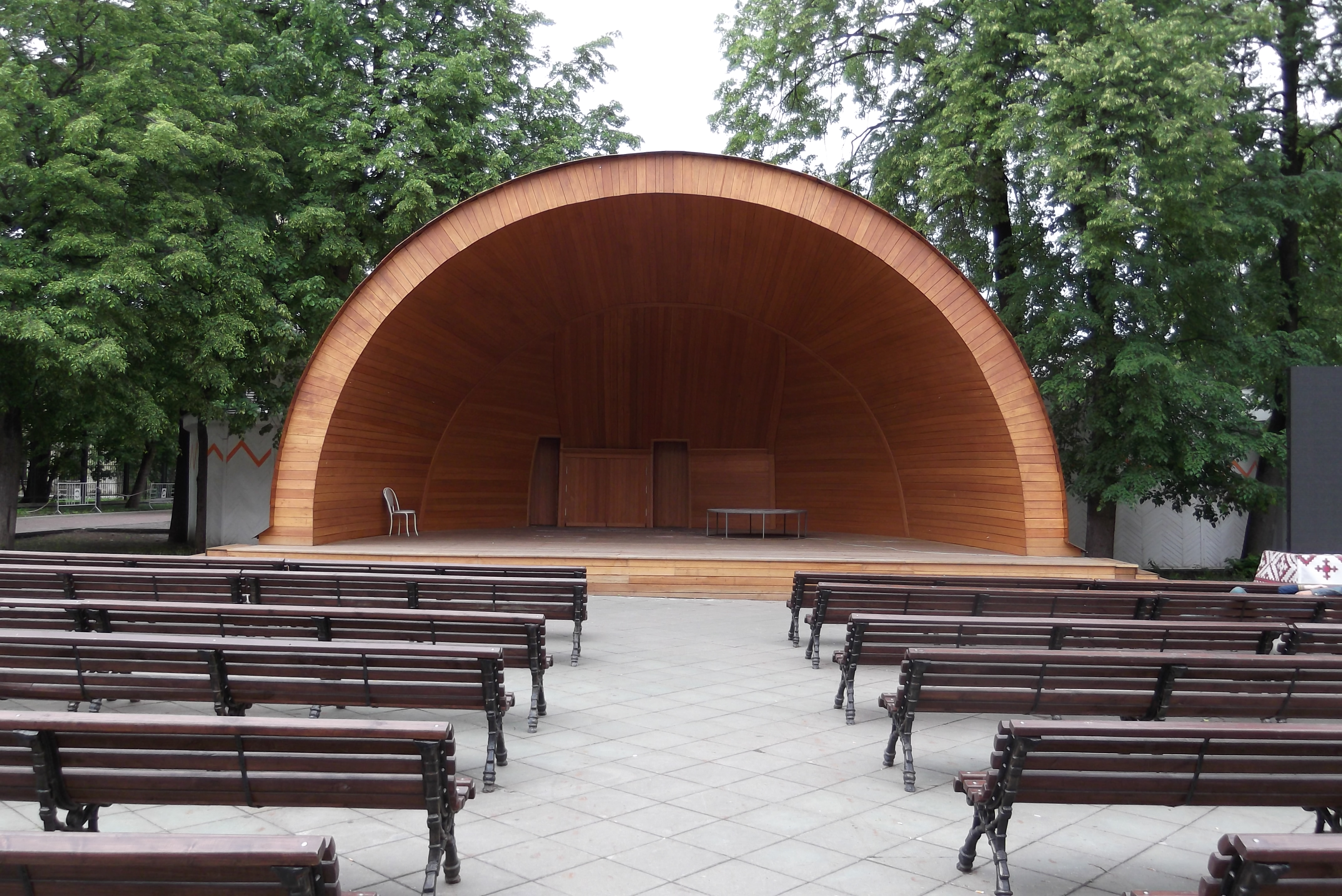
Concert stage before the renovation, 2010

In the 18th-19th centuries, private plots of noble families stood on the site of the park. These lands became partly public at the end of the 18th century when Prince Mikhail Golitsyn transferred his estate's garden, located on Staraya Basmannaya Street, 15, into public use. Residents of Moscow "were allowed to walk around it without any restrictions." In the 1900s, the private plots of the Chulkovs and Levashovs families, located nearby on Novaya Basmannaya Street, were also attached to the public garden.

The official opening of the park under a new name - the May Day Garden - took place in the spring of 1920. Founded on the site of the previous public garden, the new park was significantly enlarged with the former estate of the business magnate Nikolai Stakheev (Ivan Shishkin's nephew), located nearby on Novaya Basmannaya Street. The May Day Garden also included the Golitsyn mansion and the Belvedere artificial grotto, built in the 18th century.

In 1922, the garden was renamed after the revolutionary Nikolai Bauman. In the 1920s and 1930s, an open concert stage was erected on the park's territory. Such famous Soviet singers as Leonid Utyosov, Klavdiya Shulzhenko, and others later performed on the stage. The artificial grotto was turned into a cafe.

In 1972, a monument of Nikolai Bauman by the sculptor Vladlen Odinokov was installed in the garden. Designed according to Vladimir Klimov's architectural project, it later became one of the symbols of the park. Until 1992, the monument was located on the site of a modern playground, then it was moved to another place.

Based on the decision of the Executive Committee of the Moscow City Council of People's Deputies, in 1979, the garden obtained the status of an object of the cultural heritage of Russia.

In 2005 the Moscow Government initiated a project to restore 22 parks in the Central Administrative District. The municipal restoration project included landscape works to be carried out in the Bauman garden and park complex. In the same year, the reconstruction of the former Golitsyn mansion began in the garden.

In 2012, the architectural bureau «Wowhaus» and the director of the park, Ignat Zholobov, led renovation works on the park's territory. As a result, the Belvedere grotto was repaired, new engineering communications were laid, and the garden was equipped with free Wi-Fi access points and video surveillance cameras. Among the repaired and equipped territories also were sports areas, a playground with a ramp for children in wheelchairs, a souvenir shop, and a summer cafe with a film projector. Moreover, the old wooden covering of the Soviet concert stage was restored. New lawns, flowerbeds, and linden, poplar and maple alleys appeared in the park. In addition, new benches, urns, and small architectural decorations were installed across the garden.

In 2011, a sign «I love Moscow» was installed in the garden to commemorate the ongoing renewal of Moscow parks and pedestrian streets. The sign's project was ordered by the Department of Culture of Moscow at the «Charsky» architectural studio. Similar signs also appeared in the Muzeon and Hermitage parks. In the fall of 2012, a fountain in the form of a basilisk was constructed in the park. It was reported that the fountain was donated to Moscow by the government of Basel.

In 2013, the garden's old lighting system was replaced with special LED lamps, which park employees could remotely control from mobile devices. Evening patterned lighting also appeared on the concert stage and near Bauman's monument. Pedestrian navigation through the main park areas was improved as well, as the newly paved lanes connected two entrances to the park and a volleyball court.

In 2013, the summer ranking of Moscow parks put the Bauman Garden on the list of the top five most popular restored recreation areas along with the Krasnaya Presnya, Filevsky, and Lianozovsky parks.

The Belvedere artificial grotto was renovated in 2020–2022. The renovation was conducted in two stages. First, specialists cleared the construction's observation deck, strengthened walls and vault, and restored the stonework, imitating a natural cave. Next, they reconstructed grotto's stairs and arches and installed decorative railings. As a final part of the reconstruction, a sculpture inspired by Auguste Rodin's works was placed next to the observation deck. The grotto was officially reopened in June 2022.

== Activities ==
As of 2022, open-air events, sports, cultural, and educational activities are regularly held in the garden and park complex. The park is used for music festivals, fairs, language classes, open-air film screenings. An ice skating rink operates in the garden next to the concert stage in winter. In summer, bike rental and outdoor exercise equipment are available to park visitors. Yoga, fitness, and dancing open-air classes are also held in the garden.

The park has a summer reading room. There is also a children's club and a theater on the territory of the park complex. In the summer, they function as children's camps.

== In popular culture ==
- In 1929, the Soviet artist Aleksandr Shevchenko depicted the Bauman Garden in one of his paintings.
- The entrance to the garden from Novaya Basmannaya Street can be seen in Alexei German's film «Khrustalyov, My Car!» (1998)

== Literature ==
- Romanyuk, S. (1998). По землям московских сел и слобод [Through the lands of Moscow villages and sloboda settlements] (in Russian). Moscow: Сварог и К. p. 640. ISBN 5-93070-004-4.
- Vostryshev, M.I.; Shokarev, S.Y. (2011). Вся Москва от А до Я. Энциклопедия [Moscow from A to Z. Encyclopedia] (in Russian). Алгоритм. p. 1064. ISBN 978-5-4320-0001-9.
