= Nikolay Khlibko =

Russian actor and artistic director (1919–1993)

- Николай Хлибко
- Born: Nikolay Selivestrovich Khlibko; November 28, 1919; Tashkent, Soviet Union
- Died: November 17, 1993 (aged 73); Nizhny Novgorod
- Occupations: Actor (drama theatre, cinema); Artistic Director
- Years active: 1962 - 1990
- Awards: Honored Artist of the RSFSR (1971); Medal "For Courage" (Russia)

Nikolay Selivesterovich Khlibko (Russian: Николай Селивестрович Хлибко; November 28, 1919 – November 17, 1993) was a Soviet and Russian theatre, cinema actor and artistic director.

== Biography ==
Honored Artist of the RSFSR (1971).

Veteran of Eastern Front (World War II).

Khlibko was born on November 28, 1919, in Tashkent.

1938 – 1946 years - student of Leningrad Theatrical Institute of A. Ostrovsky (Saint Petersburg State Theatre Arts Academy nowadays). During his studies at the Institute The Great Patriotic War began. On the 3rd year of his study at the Institute Nikolay Khlibko went to fight as a volunteer in the division of the National Army. Fascist bullet pierced through his right lung, and Nikolay miraculously survived. With the end of the War he returned to the Institute and graduated interrupted studies.

Khlibko received an invitation from Arkady Raikin to work with him, and he worked under his leadership 3 years in Variety Theatre in Leningrad.

1956 – 1958 years - actor of Tashkent Russian Drama Theatre.

1962 – 1990 years - actor of Nizhny Novgorod Drama Theatre.

Khlibko was an Artistic Director of the Tashkent Polytechnic Institute. Exactly Nikolay Khlibko в конце 50-х годов by the theater group returned to the stage play of Mayakovsky "The Bedbug" and "Mystery-Bouffe". Student premiere of "The Bedbug" the entire staff of Tashkent Russian Drama Theatre attended, which immediately took the play to the repertoire with Nikolay Khlibko in a role of Prisipkin, after was "The Bedbug" in Moscow Satire Theatre and in many other theatres of USSR. So, with a creative hand of Nicholay Khlibko "The Bedbug" after years of prohibition and oblivion started a " victory march " on the theatres' stages. In 1957 after 30-year break Nikolay Khlibklo returned to the stage "Mystery-Bouffe". In this play with great praise reacted union magazine "Theatrical Life".

Khlibko was an Artistic Director of Gorky Theatre School. Students blandly called him "uncle Kolya". Among the students of Nicholay Khlibko such well-known Russian actors as Alexander Pankratov-Chyorny, Igor Ledogorov, Julian Kalisher, Irina Mazurkevich and others.

Most of his life Khlibko dedicated to theatre, but also appeared in films.

Khlibko died on November 17, 1993, in Nizhny Novgorod because of the heart attack.

== Family ==
- Wife: Aelita Khlibko, Veteran of Eastern Front (World War II), a Lecturer of the German language in the past, 25.08.1925 - 05.02.2015
- Sons: Vladimir Khlibko, Sergey Khlibko (Actor)
- Grandsons: Elena Khlibko (Actress), Vladislav Khlibko

== Theatre works ==
Role	Spectacle
Dudakov	"Summerfolk", Maxim Gorky
Bubnov	"The Lower Depths", Maxim Gorky
Sartakov	"Сonscience", D. Pavlova
Prosorov	"Chamber", Samuil Aleshin
Salov	"The Wedding Day", Viktor Rozov
Filipp	"Raft", U. Petukhov
Joe Keller	"All My Sons", Arthur Miller
Smolokurov	"On The Mountains", Pavel Melnikov-Pechersky
King	"Ambassador Extraordinary", A.& P.Tur
General Kolotov	"Serious Charge", Lev Sheynin
Edward IV	"Richard III", William Shakespeare
Priest	"Mother Courage and Her Children", Bertolt Brecht
Kolomiytsev	"The Last", Maxim Gorky
Samsonov	"Сoast", Yury Bondarev
Fob Dostov	"Kleron", M. Gashpar
Baptista	"The Taming of the Shrew", William Shakespeare
Khrukov	"Jokers", Alexander Ostrovsky
Boatswain Bay	"Destruction Of The Squadron", Alexander Korkeychuk
Caretaker Nikita	"Three of Them", Maxim Gorky
Gastritis	"Evening", Alexey Dudarev
Polivanov	"The Mayor of Lykov", D.Granin
Kuchumov	"Mad Money", Alexander Ostrovsky
Bukeev	"Yakov Bogomolov" Maxim Gorky
Neputeviy	"On The Busiest Place" Alexander Ostrovsky
Bezbedov	"Life of Klim Samgin" Maxim Gorky
Prisypkin	"The Bedbug" Vladimir Mayakovsky
Lefevr	"Madame Sans Gêne" Victorien Sardou

== Filmography ==
Year	Name	Role
1954	Housewarming	Mazaev
1958	Fiery Years	Zheleznov (leading part)
1959	There Was an Old Couple	(episode)
1968	Love of Serafim Frolov	(episode)

== Honors and awards ==
- Honored Artist of the RSFSR (1971)
- Medal "For Courage" (Russia)
