= From Dawn Till Sunset =

1975 film directed by Gavriil Egiazarov

- Movie poster
- Directed by: Gavriil Egiazarov
- Written by: Gavriil Egiazarov
- Starring: Nikolai Pastukhov; Igor Ledogorov; Zhanna Prokhorenko; Lyubov Sokolova; Boris Ivanov
- Cinematography: Pyotr Satunovsky; Valery Shuvalov
- Music by: Valentin Levashov
- Production company: Mosfilm
- Release date: 9 December 1975
- Running time: 102 min
- Country: Soviet Union
- Language: Russian

From Dawn Till Sunset (Russian: От зари до зари, romanized: Ot zari do zari) is 1975 Soviet drama film directed by Gavriil Egiazarov.

== Plot ==
The story opens in an ordinary village house, where an old Russian stove stands alongside a modern gas stove. The walls are decorated with pennants honoring Communist labor achievements and photographs. This is the home of Fyodor Rozhnov, a grain-processing operator on one of the Ural collective farms.

Rozhnov's son-in-law has recently returned from prison, where he ended up after assaulting Nadya, Rozhnov's eldest daughter, in a fit of jealousy. Nadya is no longer at home. She lives in the city, where she seems to have found happiness, while her six-year-old son Sergei remains in the village. Fyodor and his son-in-law have a difficult conversation.

The next morning, Fyodor is already busy with work. As the farm's chief grain inspector, he carries enormous responsibility for the harvest. Its success depends partly on his efficiency, and there are already plenty of problems to deal with, from power shortages to a lack of functioning machinery.

Fyodor is portrayed as an ordinary, unassuming man to whom people are naturally drawn. They come to him to share both their joys and their troubles. He is depicted as never raising his voice, and his word carries great authority within his family. The character is shown to be kind, wise, and understanding, always trying to see things from another person's perspective. His work is demanding, and the success of the harvest depends heavily on him.

One day, the driver Valentina suddenly announces that a television program about Fyodor is being broadcast. The announcer explains that it is a program about a reunion of veterans from his regiment. Hearing this brings back memories of the distant days of the war.

In one of those memories, a column of young women is being marched along a dusty road. Nazi machine gunners surround them as they are taken away for forced labor in Germany. Hidden in the bushes are three Soviet soldiers. They are hopelessly outnumbered.

Suddenly, one of the girls breaks away from the column and begins walking back toward her village. She is young and beautiful, holding her head high despite knowing what awaits her.

“Stop!”

The Germans open fire, killing her.

A moment later, a shot rings out from the bushes, and Rozhnov and his comrades rush to the women's aid. The battle brings back memories of another terrible fight, when German tanks and infantry overwhelmed their position. Their commander was killed, while Bagir remained behind, covering the others' retreat until his ammunition ran out.

It was Bagir who ultimately saved Fyodor's life.

== Cast ==
- Nikolai Pastukhov as Fyodor Vasilevich Roznov
- Igor Ledogorov as General Stukovsky
- Lyubov Sokolova as Pelagia Ivanovna Rozhnova, Fyodor Roznov's wife
- Yevgenia Sabelnikova as Valya
- Boris Tokarev as Motya Zakharov
- Zhanna Prokhorenko as Nadya, eldest daughter Feodor Vasilevich Roznov
- Boris Ivanov as Savely, a singer in a restaurant
- Valentina Berezutskaya as Makarikha
- Yevgeny Shutov as Ivanovich
- Valentina Ananina as Roznov's fellow soldiers
- Roman (Romuald) Vildan as episode
- Natalya Andrejchenko as Valya, girl in restaurant
- Georgi Georgiou as Georgii Alexandrovich, headwaiter
- Andrey Vertogradov as Anatoly, Nadya Rozhnova's Groom

== Awards ==
IX All-Union Film Festival — Best Screenplay; Second prize for Best Actor (Nikolai Pastukhov).
