= Mikhail Andreyevich Golitsyn =

Prince Mikhail Andreyevich Golitsyn (Russian: Михаил Андреевич Голицын; 1639–1687) was a member of the House of Golitsyn and governor of Pskov.

He was born in early 1639. His parents were Yevfimia Yurievna Pilemova-Saburova and her husband, Prince Andrei Andreyevich Golitsyn, governor of Siberia and voivode of Tobolsk, who died in late 1638, before the birth of his son. Andrei's father was Prince Andrei Ivanovich Golitsyn, an earlier governor of the Pskov territory.

Golitsyn belonged to the princely lineage descended from the Family of Gediminas, which reigned as Grand Dukes of Lithuania. In Russia, his family held lands and high positions in the regions of Pskov, Ingria, the republic of Veliki Novgorod, and other provinces. From 1682, Mikhail Andreyevich Golitsyn was governor of Pskov territory.

Some of his children were:

- Mikhail Mikhailovich Golitsyn (field marshal), (1675-1730), Field Marshal, who was commander-in-chief of the occupation forces in Finland during the Great Northern War, between 1714 and 1721.
- Mikhail Mikhailovich Golitsyn (admiral), (1684-1764)

== Sources ==
- Nicolas F. Ikonnikov, 1934, La Noblesse de Russie, tome: descendance de Guedimine
