= You Fell Victim to a Fateful Struggle =

"You Fell Victim" (Russian: Вы жертвою пали, romanized: Vy zhertvoyu pali, IPA: [vɨ ˈʐɛrtvəjʊ ˈpalʲɪ]), also "You Fell Victim to a Fateful Struggle", is a Russian Marxist and revolutionary funeral march. It acted as the funeral dirge of the Russian revolutionary movement, among them the Bolsheviks.

The song was written in 1878; the lyrics were written by Anton Arkhangelsky (Anton Amosov (1854-1915)), and the musical arrangements were made by Nikolay Ikonikov.

The opening stanza reads: Вы жертвою пали в борьбе роковой, любви беззаветной к народу, Вы отдали все, что могли за него. За жизнь, его честь и свободу. which can be translated as : You fell victim into a fatal battle of selfless love for the people. You gave away all that you could for it, for its life, honor, and freedom.

During the funeral of the Bolshevik Nikolay Bauman, a student orchestra joined the procession near the St. Petersburg Conservatory, playing "You Fell Victim to a Fateful Struggle" repeatedly.

The melody of "You Fell A Victim" was used by Dmitri Shostakovich in the third part of his Symphony No. 11; it had since the end of the 19th century often been the funeral march of Russian revolutionaries. The same melody was used in Edmund Meisel's score for Sergei Eisenstein's Battleship Potemkin, in the scene of the funeral of Grigory Vakulinchuk.

The melody also forms the basis of the 1936 composition "Russian Funeral" by Benjamin Britten, scored for brass and percussion.

== Bibliography ==
- Königsberg, A. K.; Mikheev, L. V. (2000). 111 симфоний. St. Petersburg: Культ-информ-пресс. ISBN 5-8392-0174-X.
