= Battle of Grengam =

Major naval battle in the Great Northern War

- Part of the Great Northern War
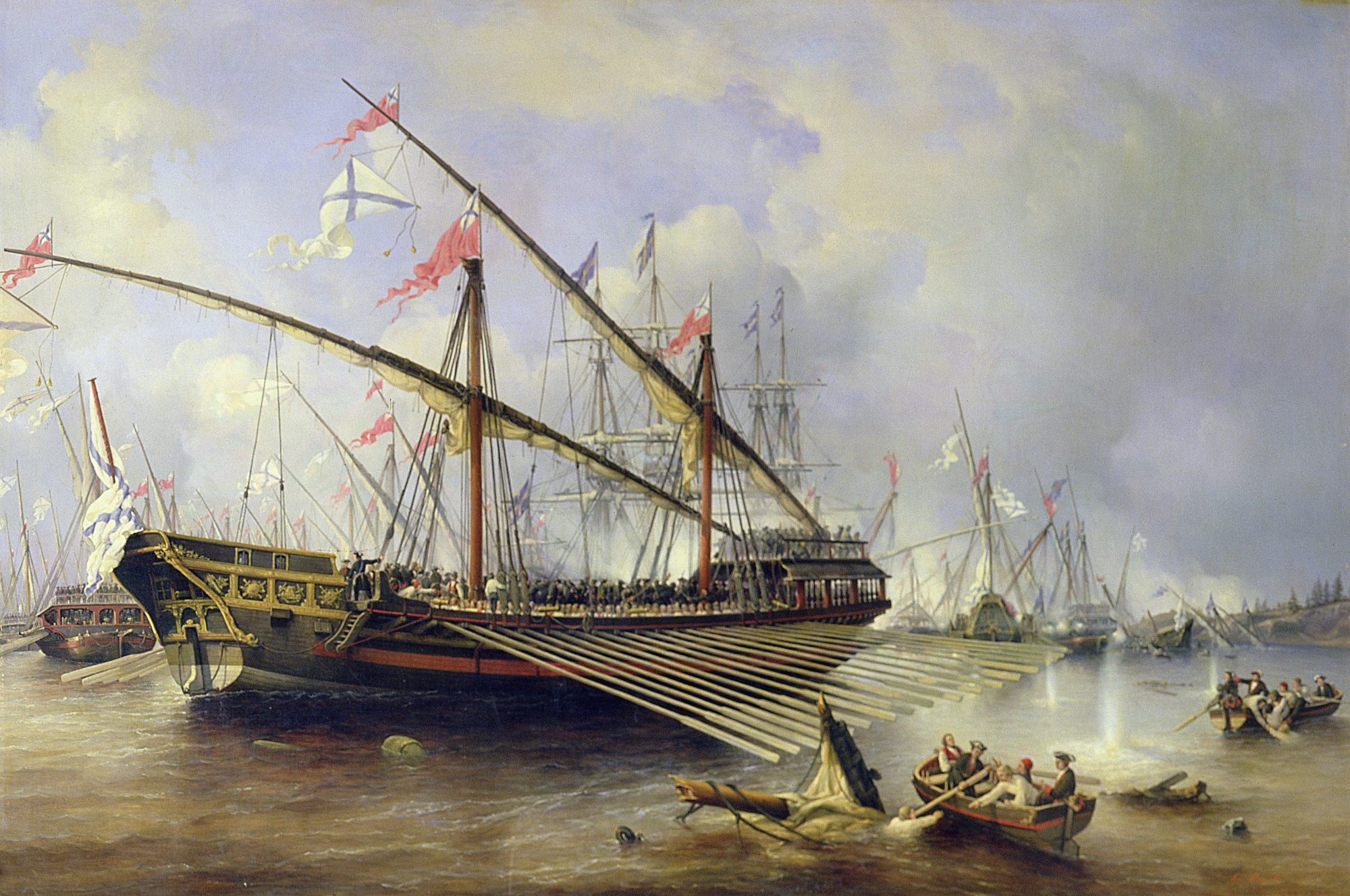
- The Battle of Grengam, 1720 by Ferdinand Victor Perrot.
Date	27 July 1720 (O.S.); 7 August 1720 (N.S.)
Location	Near Granhamn in the Ledsund strait, Åland, Sweden (now Finland)
Result	See aftermath

Belligerents
Swedish Navy	Imperial Russian Navy

Commanders and leaders
Vice Admiral Carl Georg Siöblad	General Mikhail Golitsyn; Matija Zmajević

Strength
1 Ship of the line 4 frigates 3 galleys 6 smaller craft over 1,000 sailors	61 galleys 29 boats 11,000 sailors and soldiers

Casualties and losses
103 killed, 407 taken prisoner, 4 frigates captured	Russian accounts: 1 galley burnt 42 galleys damaged 82 killed and 203–236 wounded Swedish accounts: 43 galleys 1,100 to 2,000 killed

The Battle of Grengam (Russian: Гренгамское морское сражение, Swedish: Slaget vid Ledsund or Slaget vid Föglöfjärden, Finnish: Flisön taistelu) of 1720 was the last major naval battle in the Great Northern War that took place in Åland, in the Ledsund strait between the island communities of Föglö and Lemland. The battle marked the end of Russian and Swedish offensive naval operations in Baltic waters. The Russian fleet conducted one more raid on the Swedish coast in spring 1721, whereupon the Treaty of Nystad was signed, ending the war.

== Location of the battle ==
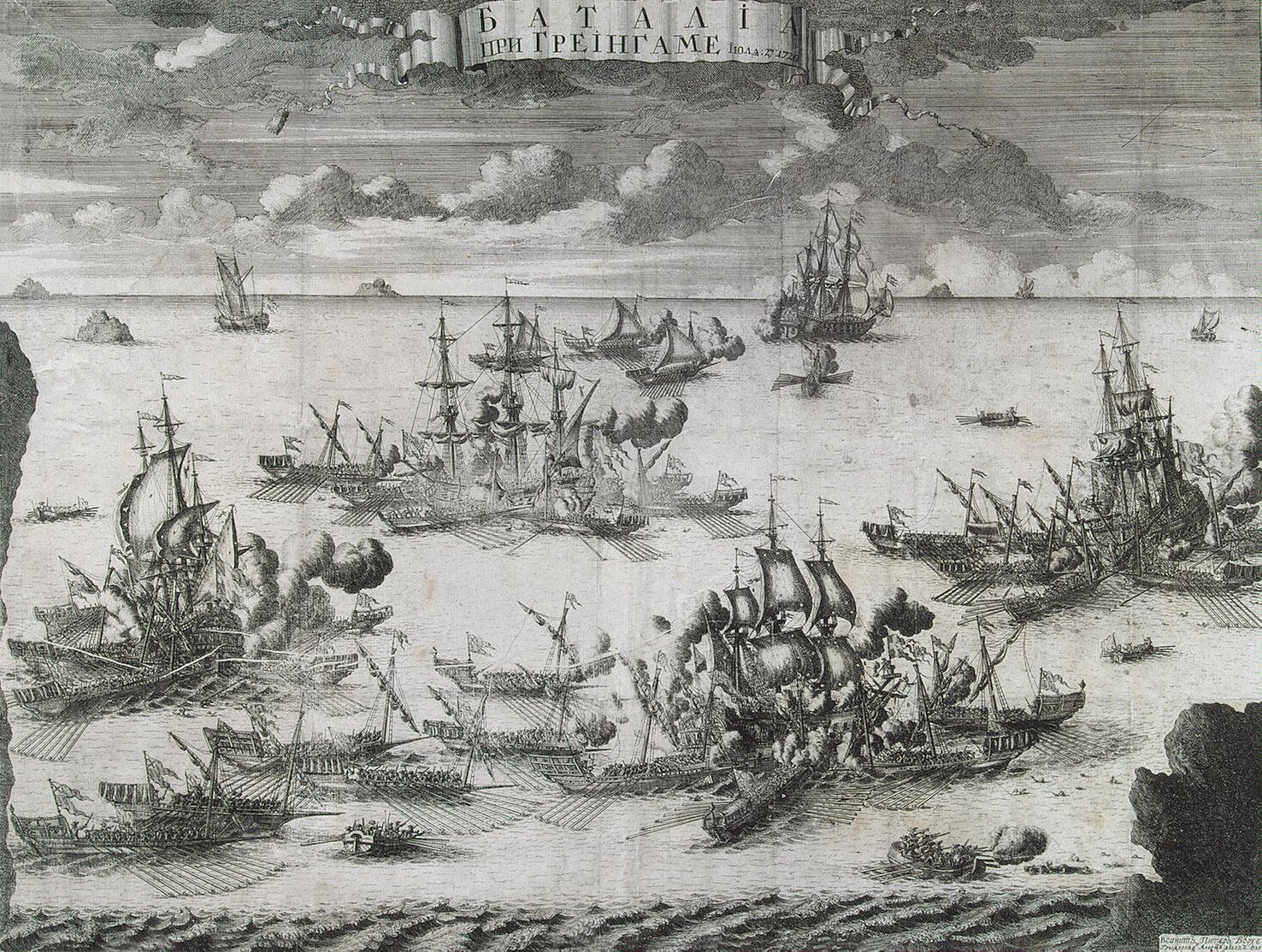
The Battle of Grengam, 27 July 1720. A 1721 etching by Alexey Zubov.

The main shipping route between the ports of Stockholm in Sweden and Turku in Finland passes through the Åland Islands. It enters the Ledsund strait from south-west with Föglö on the south-east side and Lemland on the north-west. An anchorage (60°0′0″N 20°18′0″E) of the shore of Flisö in Föglö is protected from the prevailing south-westerly winds by two small islands. This anchorage was previously called Granhamn, Swedish for 'Spruce harbor'. On modern maps it is marked as Rödskärs flädan after the larger of the two protecting islands. The smaller island is now called Granhamns holmen or Granhamn's island. It should not be confused with the island also named Granhamn in the Stockholm archipelago.

=== Name ===
The word Grengam in the name of the battle is a romanization of Гренгам, which is the traditional Russian cyrillization of Gränhamn, an older spelling of Granhamn. The spelling Gränhamn was used on Hans Hansson's map of Åland from about 1650. In Sweden the battle is known as the Battle of Ledsund after the Ledsund strait. In Finland the name Battle of Flisö (Finnish: Flisön meritaistelu) is used.

== Battle ==
The Swedish and Russian accounts of the battle differ significantly. Both sides agree that on 27 July 1720 a group of Swedish ships under Vice Admiral Carl Georg Siöblad attacked the Russian fleet and, in a pitched battle, had their four frigates captured by Russian sailors.

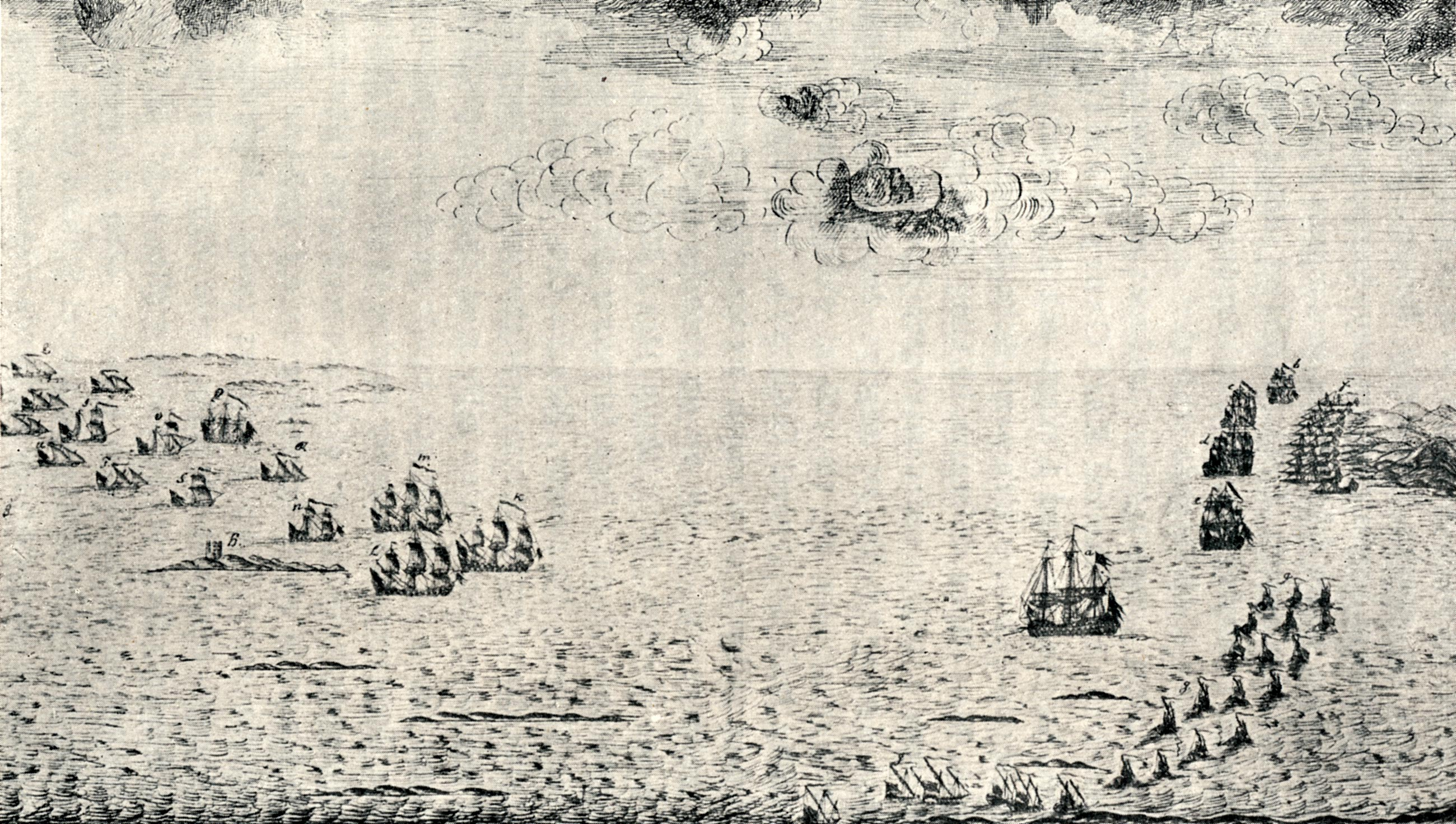
Contemporary Swedish drawing of the battle, showing the Swedish ship of the line and frigates closing in on the Russian galleys.

=== Russian accounts ===
The Swedish squadron consisting of a 52-gun ship of the line, four frigates and nine smaller craft with a total of 156 guns and over 1,000 marines, made an attempt to attack the moving Russian fleet. General Mikhail Golitsyn managed to take an advantageous position in the narrow and shallow strait of Flisesund and ordered his ships into a semicircle formation. The Swedish ship of the line and four frigates entered the strait in pursuit of the Russian ships. Two frigates ran aground, making maneuvering for the rest of the squadron difficult.

In the fierce battle that followed, all four Swedish frigates were boarded. The only ship that managed to escape was Siöblad’s flagship.

=== Swedish accounts ===
A small Swedish naval unit sailed right into the mighty Russian fleet anchored at Granhamn. A fierce battle took place, the Swedes lost their four frigates after they had run aground but the Russian losses became so heavy that the entire fleet quickly decided to withdraw from Åland, leaving 43 sunken ships and 1000 dead Russians behind. The Russian losses prevented their navy from launching any further major operations until the war ended with the Treaty of Nystad the following year.

Large warships of the Swedish squadron
Name	Swedish Classification	Artillery
Pommern	Ship of the line	22 × 18-pounder guns; 22 × 8-pounder guns; 10 × 4-pounder guns; 2 × 3-pounder guns
Stor Phoenix	Frigate	2 × 12-pounder guns; 18 × 8-pounder guns; 10 × 4-pounder guns
Vainqueur	Armed Merchantman	24 × 6-pounder guns; 6 × 3-pounder guns
Kiskin	Armed Merchantman	6 × 8-pounder guns; 14 × 4-pounder guns; 4 × 3-pounder guns
Danska Örn	Frigate	4 × 6-pounder guns; 14 × 4-pounder guns

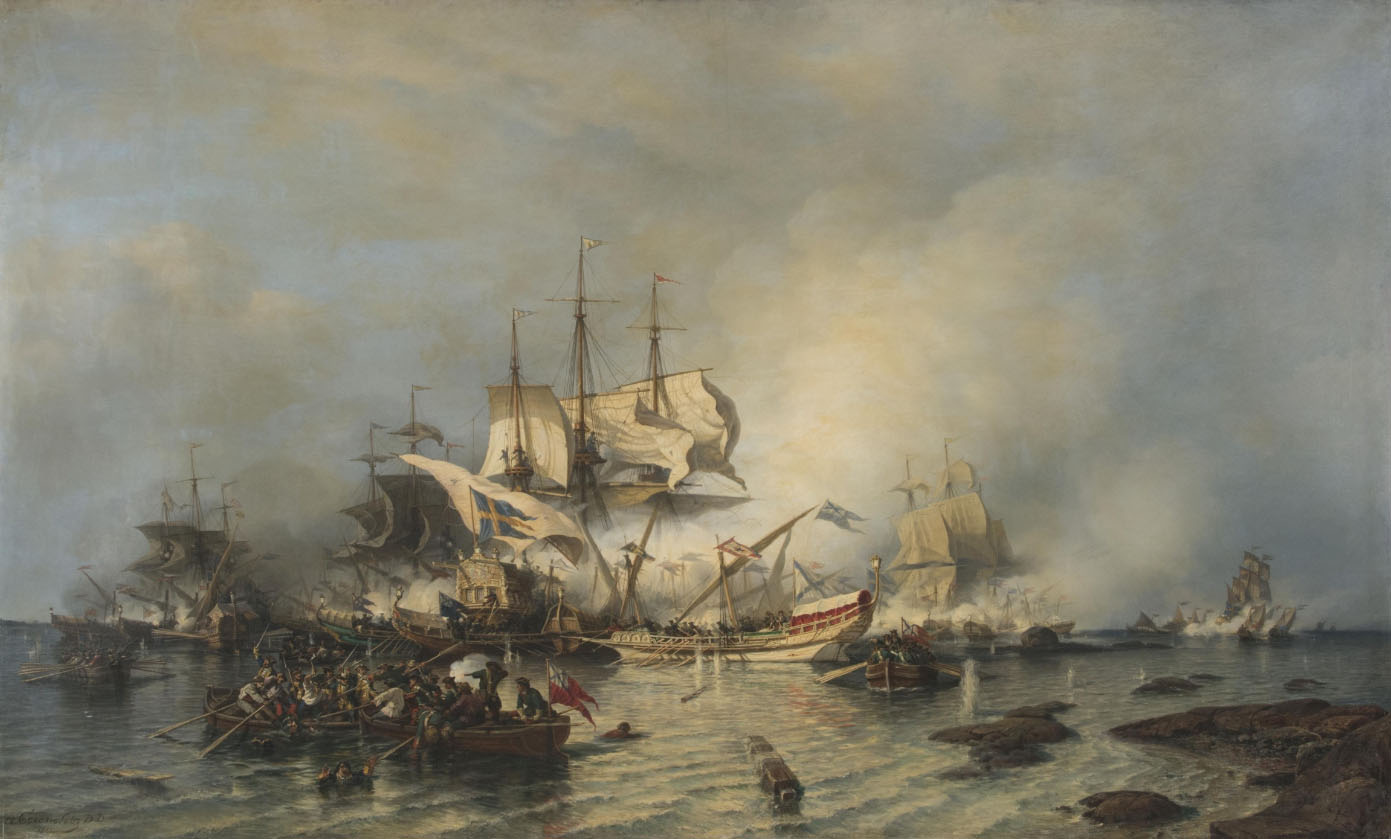
The battle by Alexey Bogolyubov

== Aftermath ==
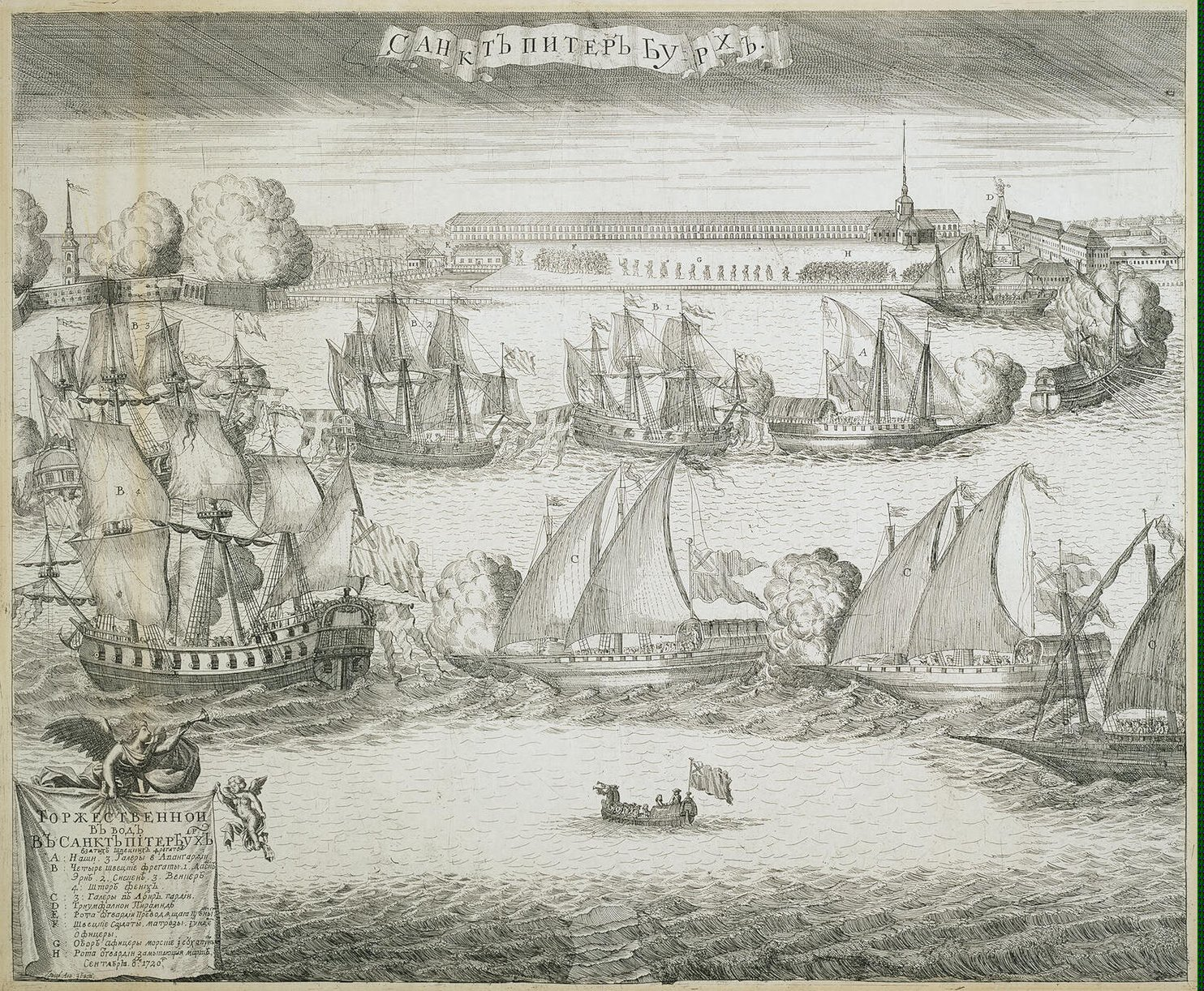
Ceremonial entrance of four captured Swedish frigates into Saint Petersburg. Etching by Alexei Zubov.

Both sides claimed the outcome of the battle as their own victory. They agreed only in that four Swedish frigates, the 34-gun frigate Stor Phoenix, the 30-gun Vainqueur, the 22-gun Kiskin and the 18-gun Danska Örn were captured by the Russians. Nevertheless, assessments since the battle generally accord the Russians with a significant victory contributing to Russia's overall victory in the war. No naval battles of a similar scale took place between the Russian and Swedish navies after the battle of Grengam until Sweden's defeat in the war was sealed by the Treaty of Nystad.

=== Russian accounts ===
The Swedes lost 103 killed and 407 captured. The Russians had 82 killed and 236 wounded. 42 galleys were damaged, and galley "Wesfish" was abandoned and burnt after the battle. The Battle of Grengam demonstrated the skillful use of the rowing fleet in the skerries environment and efficient reconnaissance and selection of the combat site, as well as perfect timing for the attack from different directions. The victory at Grengam allowed the Russians to consolidate in the archipelago, which was very important for carrying out operations against Swedish shipping in the area.

=== Swedish accounts ===
Four Swedish frigates ran aground and were captured by the Russian Navy. 43 out of 61 Russian galleys, were either sunk by the Swedish force or burnt and abandoned after the battle. The Swedish Vice Admiral Carl Georg Siöblad was initially criticised after the battle, but when the scope of the Russian losses were discovered he was praised. Russia celebrated the battle as a victory, but their fleet was unable to launch effective operations until the end of the war in 1721.

== Commemoration ==
Like the previous Battle of Gangut, the Battle of Grengam was fought on Saint Pantaleon Day. In order to commemorate the perceived victory, a timber church to this saint was built in Saint Petersburg in 1722. It was rebuilt in stone in 1735–1739. Since 1914 the facade of the church has borne two marble plaques listing the ships and regiments that fought at Gangut and Grengam.

== Sources ==
- Wilson, Alastair, Callo, Joseph F., Who's who in Naval History: From 1550 to the Present, Routledge, 2004 ISBN 0-415-30828-3
- Morfill, William Richard, A History of Russia: From the Birth of Peter the Great to Nicholas II, James Pott Publisher, London, 1902 OCLC 187203793
- George Bruce. Harbottle's Dictionary of Battles. Van Nostrand Reinhold, 1981 ISBN 0-442-22336-6
- (in Swedish) Gunnar Unger (1923). Illustrerad svensk sjökrigshistoria, omfattande tiden 1680–1814. Albert Bonniers Förlag, Stockholm. OCLC 464453197
- (in Swedish) Magnus Ullman, Rysshärjningarna på Ostkusten sommaren 1719 ISBN 9789163176029
