= Alexander Mikhailovich Golitsyn (vice chancellor) =

Russian politician

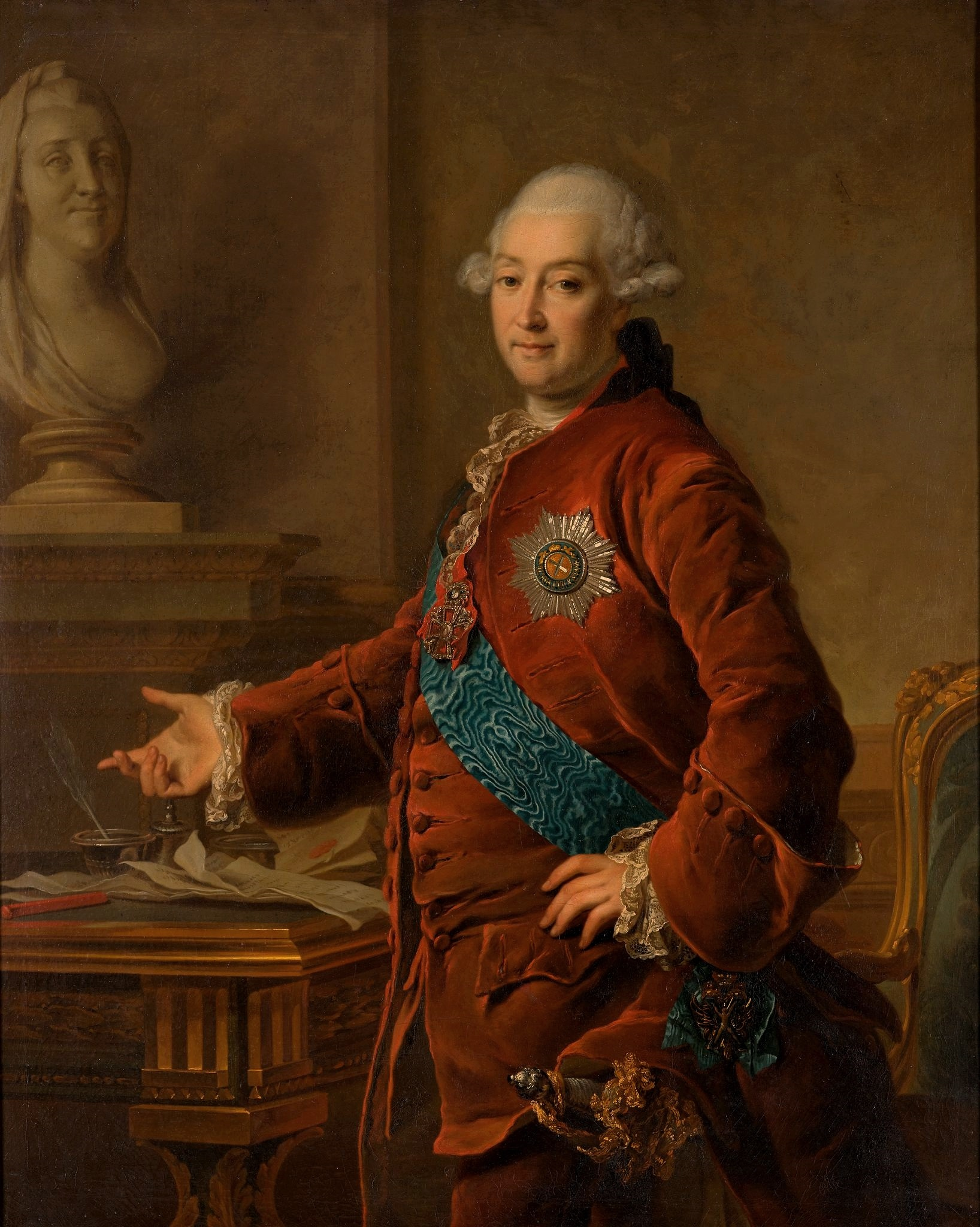
Alexander Mikhailovich Golitsyn, a 1772 portrait by Dmitry Levitzky

Prince Alexander Mikhailovich Golitsyn (Russian: Александр Михайлович Голицын; 17 November [O.S. 6 November] 1723 – 27 November [O.S. 15 November] 1807) - was a representative of the younger branch of the House of Golitsyn; a Russian envoy to the Dutch Republic, Great Britain, and Vice-Chancellor. A connoisseur of art, a collector and philanthropist, Golitsyn was one of the key figures of the Russian Enlightenment: he acted as a cultural intermediary between Russia and Europe, inviting foreign artists and sculptors to St. Petersburg, purchasing works of art and books for Catherine II.

== Biography ==
He was born on 17 November [O.S. 6 November] 1723, as the eldest son of General-Admiral Mikhail Mikhailovich Golitsyn from his marriage to Tatiana, the daughter of the Moscow governor Kirill Alekseyevich Naryshkin. He studied in Geneva together with Alexander Sergeyevich Stroganov? In 1742, he began serving at the Russian Embassy in Holland. In 1749, he was on a brief unofficial mission to Paris, as part of the Austrian Embassy. In 1755–1761, he was an envoy to London and became involved in the Seven Years' War. In 1762 he was appointed Knight of the Order of Alexander Nevsky.

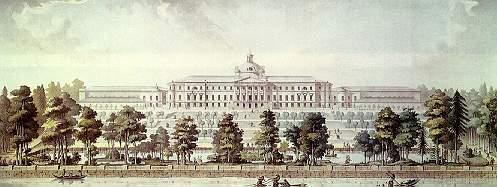
A view of the Golitsyn hospital in Moscow back in 1770s

He contributed to the accession to the throne of Catherine II of Russia. During the June coup of 1762, Golitsyn was sent to Peter III of Russia who wrote to Catherine a letter in which the emperor "asked for a pardon" and permission to retire in a foreign country. He died within a few days in Ropsha on his estate Ropshinsky under unclear circumstances. Grigory Teplov is named as one of the murderers. Emperor Paul I of Russia was convinced that his father was forcibly deprived of life, but he apparently could not find any evidence of this.

From 9 June 1762 to 2 April 1775 he was Privy Councillor (1764), senator, and Chief Chamberlain and member of the Collegium of Foreign Affairs. Dmitry Alekseevich Golitsyn carried on a lively correspondence with his cousin, Alexander Mikhailovich Golitsyn. In this correspondence they discussed precisely the problems of serfdom and issues related to the allocation of property to peasants.

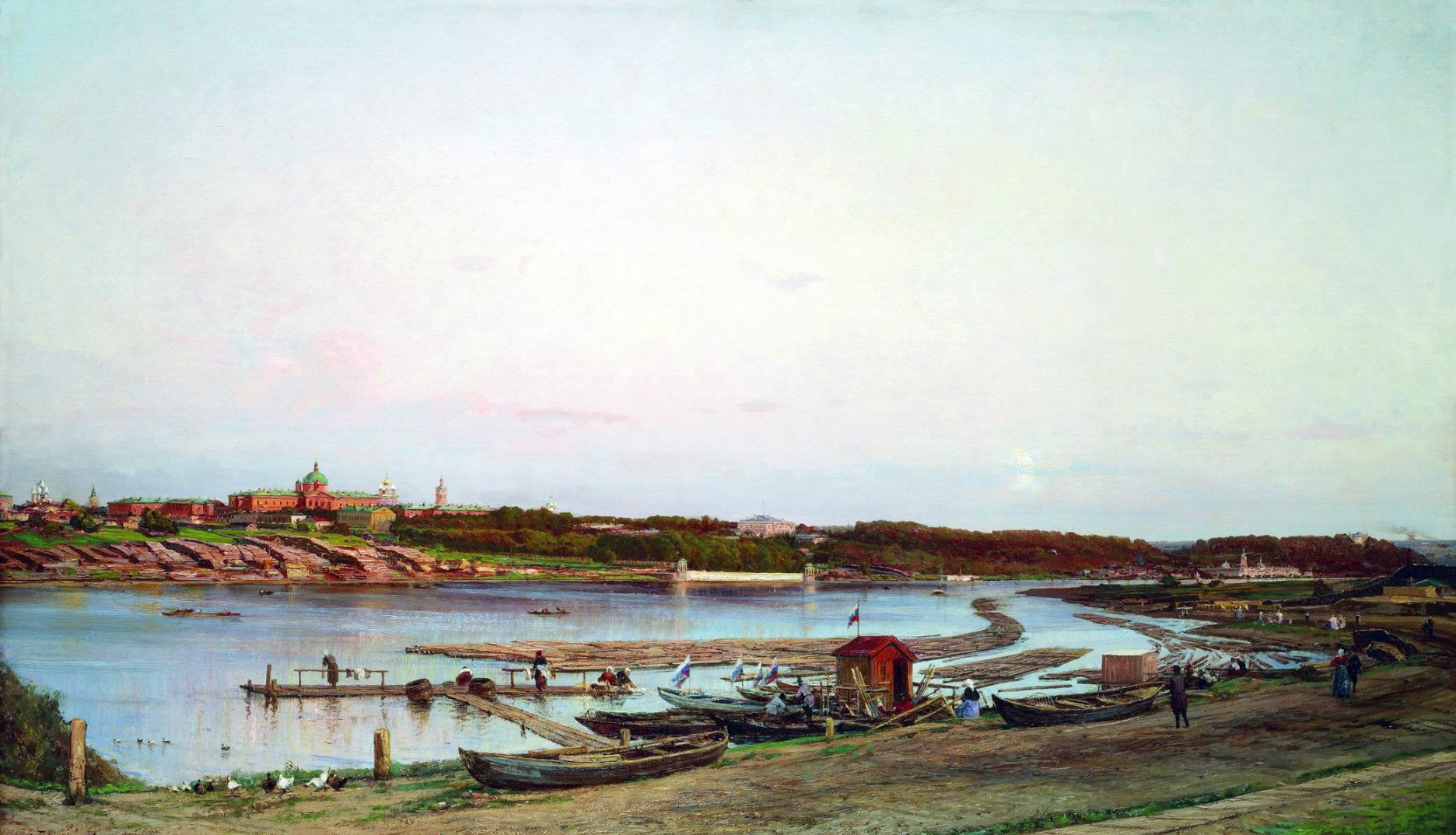
View of Golitsyn Hospital and Neskuchny Garden. (Painting by Alexey Bogolyubov, 1879)

In 1764 he was involved in the collection of paintings Catharina received from Johann Ernst Gotzkowsky. which is regarded as the birth of Hermitage Museum. In 1771 he collaborated with his cousin Dmitri Alekseyevich Gallitzin in The Hague to acquire rare paintings after the death of Gerrit Braamcamp, but the valuable cargo on board of Vrouw Maria got lost near the coast of Finland in a storm.

As Vice-chancellor for more than a decade, he did not enjoy the Empress's favor. (His cousin expressed criticism on the First Partition of Poland in 1772.) Interested mainly in the external side of diplomatic relations, Golitsyn had no influence on affairs; the head of Russian politics was Panin. Foreigners did not rate Prince Golitsyn's abilities very highly, but they noted that he always stood outside the parties and avoided intrigues. According to the British envoy, he "confused rather than helped, even in the trifles to which he was allowed".

In 1774, he received the Order of St. Andrew and became a senator; Chief Chamberlain (1775). In 1778, he retired and lived in Moscow, doing charitable work. He was an Honorary Guardian of the Moscow Foster home and a trustee of Pavlovsk Hospital. He ordered to build Golitsyn Hospital, using the capital of his late cousin Prince Dmitry Mikhailovich Golitsyn the Younger. He enjoyed the attention and favor of the emperors Paul I of Russia and Alexander I of Russia and especially Maria Feodorovna. Prince Golitsyn died on 27 November [O.S. 15 November] 1807 in Moscow. He was buried in the Church of St. Demetrius, demolished in 1934.

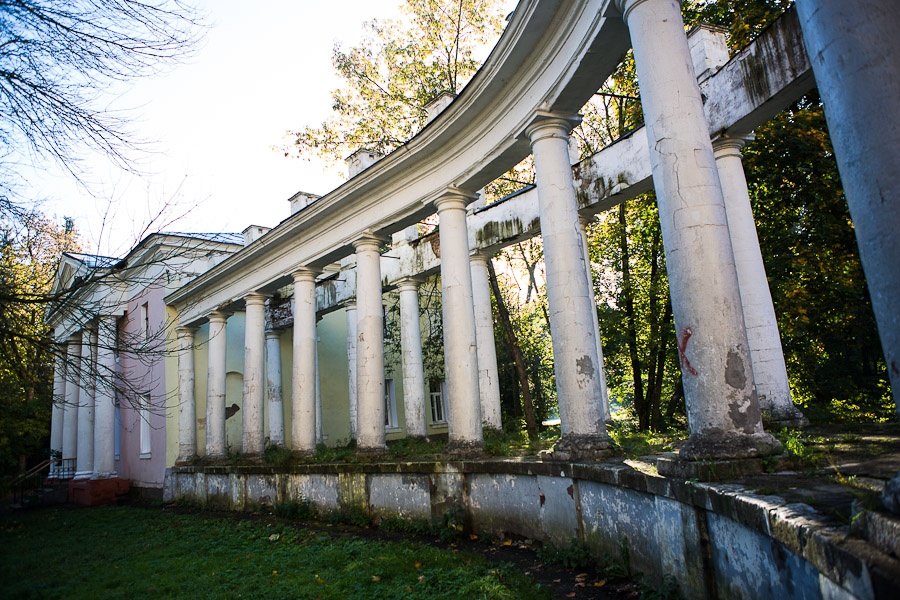
A.M. Golitsyn continued to renovate the estate Pekhra-Yakovlevskoe (1782).

== Legacy ==
Golitsyn did much to decorate the estate Pekhra-Yakovlevskoe. He collected a whole museum of rare paintings and sculptures. Considering that his collection would be useful to the fatherland, he bequeathed it to the Golitsyn Hospital for eternal storage so that it would not be fragmented. In 1809, his nephew, Sergei Mikhailovich (1774–1859), completed the building that was built on the territory of the hospital by A.M. Golitsyn in 1803 to house an art gallery. It was the first Moscow public gallery of Western European art that exhibited 477 paintings, as well as statues and vases. The gallery lasted until 1817, when its exhibits were sold at auctions.
