= Nikolay Bauman =

Russian revolutionary and politician (1873–1905)

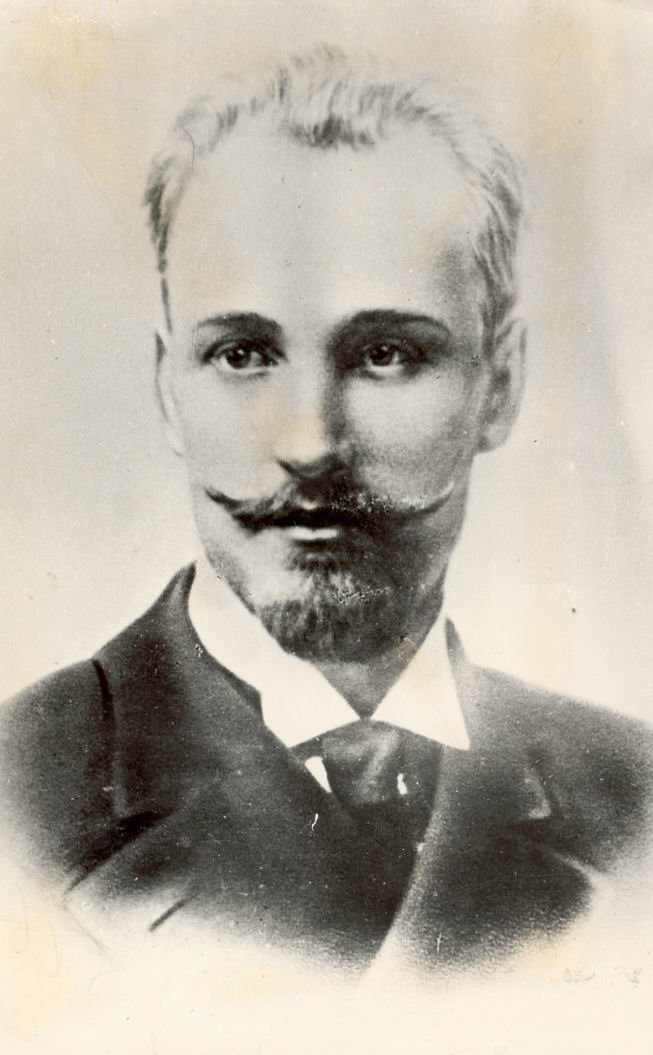
- Bauman some time before 1905
- Born: Nikolay Ernestovich Bauman; 29 May [O.S. 17 May] 1873; Kazan, Russian Empire
- Died: 31 October [O.S. 18 October] 1905; Moscow, Russian Empire
- Resting place: Vagankovo Cemetery, Moscow
- Occupations: Professional revolutionary Bolshevik politician

Nikolay Ernestovich Bauman (Russian: Николай Эрнестович Бауман; 29 May [O.S. 17 May] 1873 – 31 October [O.S. 18 October] 1905) was a Russian revolutionary of the Bolshevik Party.

His death in a struggle with a royalist upon his release from Taganka Prison in 1905 made him one of the first martyrs of the revolution, and later of the Soviet Union.

== Biography ==
=== Early years ===
Bauman was born to the owner of a wallpaper- and carpentry-workshop, and into a family of Volga-German origins. He attended the 2nd Kazan Secondary School, but dropped out in the 7th grade because of disagreements with his teachers. From 1891 to 1895, he was a student at the Kazan Veterinary Institute. During his student years he was fascinated by illegal populist and Marxist literature, and participated in various underground groups of workers. After receiving his diploma as a veterinary doctor, Bauman began work at the village of Novye Burasy in the Saratov Region and dreamt of becoming involved in revolutionary propaganda there. However, being known of by the police, and wishing to achieve broad revolutionary activity, in the fall of 1896 he left for Saint Petersburg.

== Political career ==
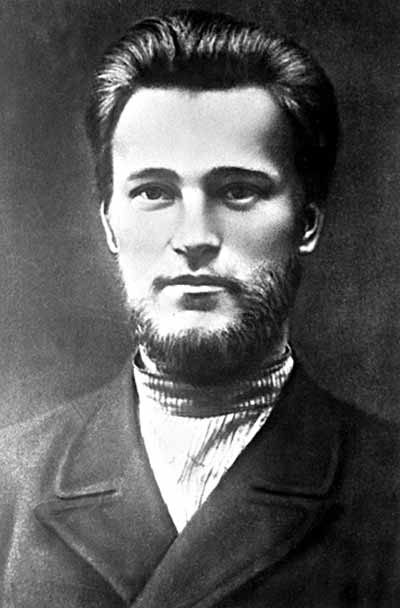
Bauman as a student in the late 19th-century

From 1896 to 1897, he worked in Petersburg, serving a term in the "Petersburg Union of Struggle for the Liberation of the Working Class." Bauman was arrested on 22 March 1897, and imprisoned in the Peter and Paul Fortress, where he was kept in solitary confinement for 19 months. During his stay in the fortress, he was astonishingly allowed to read Karl Marx's Das Kapital.

In 1899, he was exiled to Vyatka Governorate, but he managed to escape abroad the same year. In April 1900, he took part of the second congress of the Emancipation of Labour Group, led by the founder of Russian Marxism Georgi Plekhanov, in Geneva. It was at that congress that Plekhanov's group decided to merge with the Union of Struggle and launch the revolutionary Marxist paper Iskra – "The Spark", which was to be published abroad and smuggled into Russia. After Vladimir Lenin had arrived in Munich in 1900, after serving a term of exile, and took on the management of Iskra, Bauman worked closely with him in getting the project organised. In December 1901, he was sent to Moscow to make contact with the illegal Marxist groups in the region and enlist their help in distributing Iskra. He was soon under observation by the Okhrana, and moved to Kyiv, and then Voronezh, but on the way to Voronezh, noticed that he was being followed, and jumped from a train as it passed through Zadonsky District. Arrested in February 1902, he was held in Lukyanivska Prison in Kyiv. He and three other prisoners, including the future foreign minister Maxim Litvinov, pulled off a daring escape from the prison, using ropes, grappling irons, and false passports, after they had overpowered two of the prison staff.

=== Bauman affair ===
While exiled in 1899, Bauman had an affair with the wife of a fellow revolutionary who became pregnant with Bauman's child. Bauman responded by openly mocking her, and circulating a vicious cartoon of her as the Virgin Mary with a baby in her womb, with a caption asking "who the baby looked like". The woman later hanged herself.

This story had gained wide currency among Russian political exiles by the time Bauman reappeared in Switzerland in 1902, after the escape from Kiev. Some of those involved in producing Iskra, including Lenin's closest friend and collaborator, Julius Martov and Pavel Axelrod, one of the founders of Russian Marxism, wanted Bauman expelled from the organisation. In 1903, the board of Iskra adjudicated the matter, and Lenin interceded on Bauman's behalf. According to biographer Robert Service, Lenin rejected the party's right to interfere, arguing that the party's task "was to make revolution against the Romanov monarchy and to vet the morality of comrades only when and in so far as their actions affected the implementation of the task". The subsequent controversy divided the party, and has been described as "one of the many personal clashes which came to define the ethical distinctions" between the Bolshevik and Menshevik factions after 1903.

=== Later career ===
In 1903, using the pseudonym Sorokin, he was a delegate from the Moscow organisation to the Second Party Congress, during which the split between Bolsheviks and Mensheviks opened up. Bauman supported Lenin views on every issue raised. During increasingly heated arguments, he was accused by Martov of lying. Lenin's widow noted that just before the decisive vote "Axelrod was reproaching Bauman ('Sorokin') for what seemed to him to be a lack of moral sense, and recalled some unpleasant gossip from exile days. Bauman remained silent, and tears came to his eyes." In December 1903, he returned illegally to Moscow, crossing the border under the name "Grach" (Rook), to organise the northern bureau of the Bolshevik faction, and set up an illegal print shop for producing Bolshevik literature. In spring 1904, he was arrested while walking in Moscow's Petrovsky Park, and interned in Taganka Prison, but released on bail on 10 October 1905.

== Death ==
In the wake of the October Manifesto, the Left started the chain of unrests in big Russian industrial centres, including the city of Moscow.

Bauman, as a member of Central Committee of RSDRP, was very active in assembling and igniting the crowds to march on the Moscow Governorate Prison, from which he himself was released recently, to demand the release of political prisoners under the red banner with the motto: 'Let's level the Russian Bastille to the ground!' While riding a cab with the said banner, Bauman shouted: 'Down with the Tsar! Down with the Empire!'

At one point, 29-year old employee of the Shchapov's Factory — Nikolay Mikhalin, a former soldier with the Emperor's Own Horse Guard Regiment (an elite cuirassier regiment of the Russian Imperial Guards) and a keen monarchist, armed with a cut-out of a steel pipe, got into cab and confronted Bauman, trying to take a red banner from the latter. In the following struggle, Bauman somehow managed to produce a Browning semi-automatic pistol and shot at Mikhalin once, but the latter, a six-feet tall dark-haired man of considerable strength — with the help of his swordsmanship — managed to hit Bauman on the pistol-holding arm with his pipe cut-out, so he missed Mikhalin, who then struck Bauman three times on the head with the same instrument, causing almost instant death (with two hits later described by a doctor as deadly).

According to records of the CPSU, Bauman was the first member of Central Committee of the Bolshevik party to die a violent death. Mikhalin voluntarily gave himself up to the police within an hour of the incident and was sentenced by the Moscow District Court to 18 months of imprisonment for disproportional use of force causing death to the victim. He was never pardoned by Imperial Russia, and later caught by Soviet OGPU in 1925, and records of him since then are unknown, however it is believed he was executed in the same year.

== Funeral ==
Bauman's death made him a martyr of the Revolution, which effectively 'cleansed him of his sins'. His death enabled the Bolsheviks to play on the sympathies of the masses for the first time in the party's history. As a result, tens of thousands attended his funeral procession, people who saw in Bauman's death 'the fate of the Revolution' if they 'did not unite against' the reactionaries.

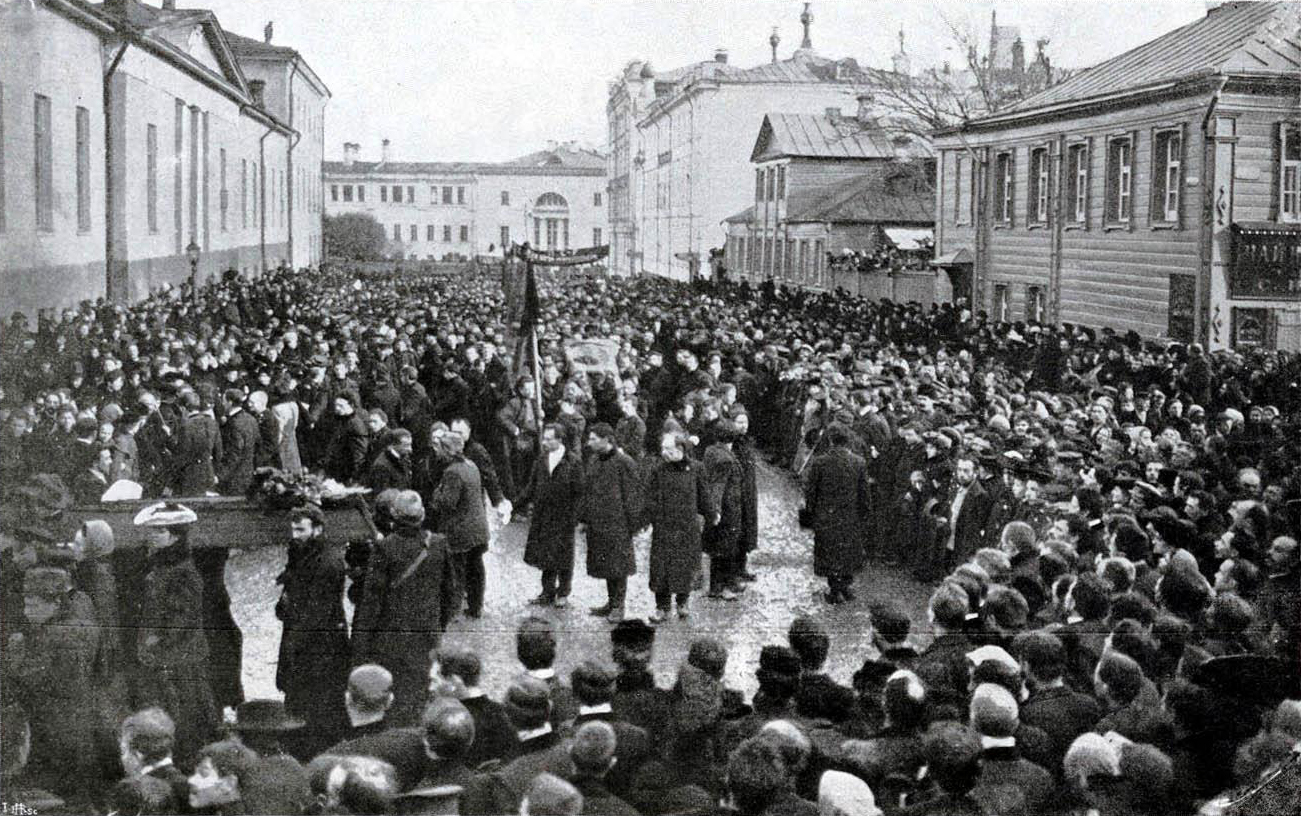
Funeral of Nikolay Bauman

Bauman's funeral was a mighty propaganda exercise. His coffin was carried through the streets of Moscow by six leather-cled 'Herculean' party members, with the coffin itself draped in scarlet pall. The procession was led by a party comrade dressed in 'Jesuitical-black', who carried a palm branch which he in time with the music and slow steps swung from side to side. Behind him, the leaders of the party followed, carrying red flags and large velvet banners carrying the 'slogans of their struggle' in gold writing, and wreaths. At their sides they were followed by an 'armed militia' consisting of workers and students. Finally, behind these, over 100,000 mourners followed marching ten abreast in military like formation.

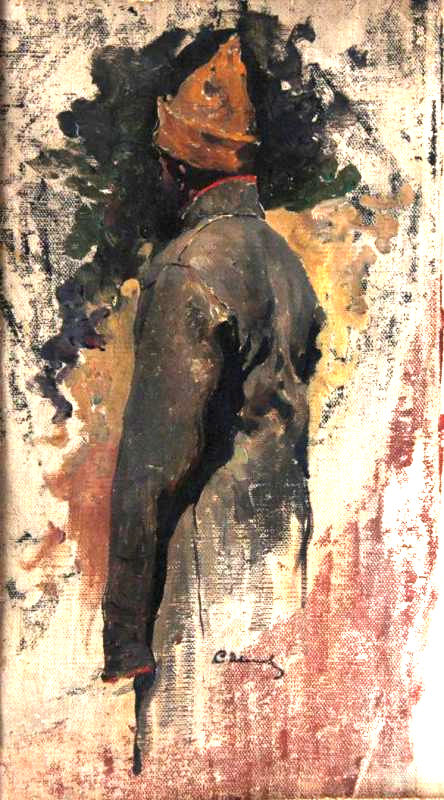
Man in a Budenovka. Study for the painting "Bauman's Funeral" by Sergey Ivanov, 1905

The procession marched all day, only stopping to pick up reinforcements at certain areas of the city. Passing the Conservatory, a student orchestra joined in playing 'You Fell Victim to a Fateful Struggle' – the Revolution's very own 'funeral song' – repeatedly. The procession 'filled the streets with a dark menace', with the heaviness of the procession, the sadness of the music and the military discipline of the long rows of mourners. As night came, several thousand torches were lit; this caused the large red banners achieve a sort of glow, further contributing to the spectacle.

Graveside, the orations were emotional. His self-proclaimed widow Kapitolina Medvedeva (they were not officially married under the law of the Russian Empire) urged the crowds to avenge the death of her husband Nikolay. As the large group made its way back to the city, some fighting broke out with groups of the Black Hundreds.

== Legacy ==
=== Bolshevik veneration ===
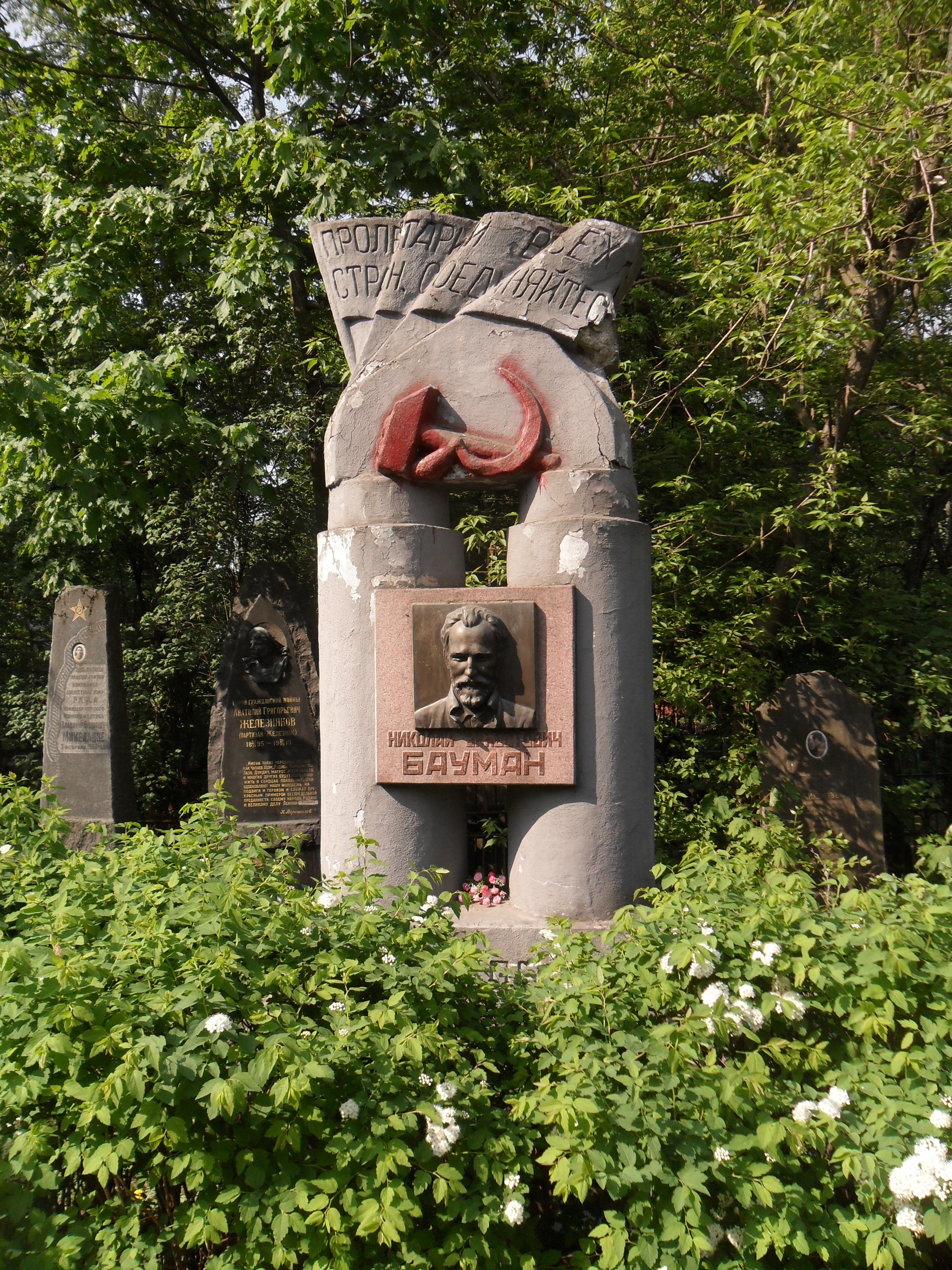
Bauman's tomb in the Vagankovo Cemetery of Moscow.

Under the Bolshevik regime, Bauman's name would be given to factories, schools and streets, and a district of Moscow.

Currently, a region, square, park, Metro station, and street in Moscow are named after Bauman, as well as the Bauman Moscow State Technical University.

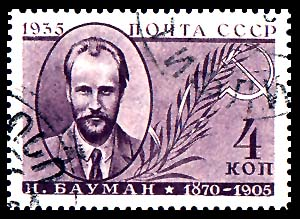
Soviet stamp (1935) depicting Bauman

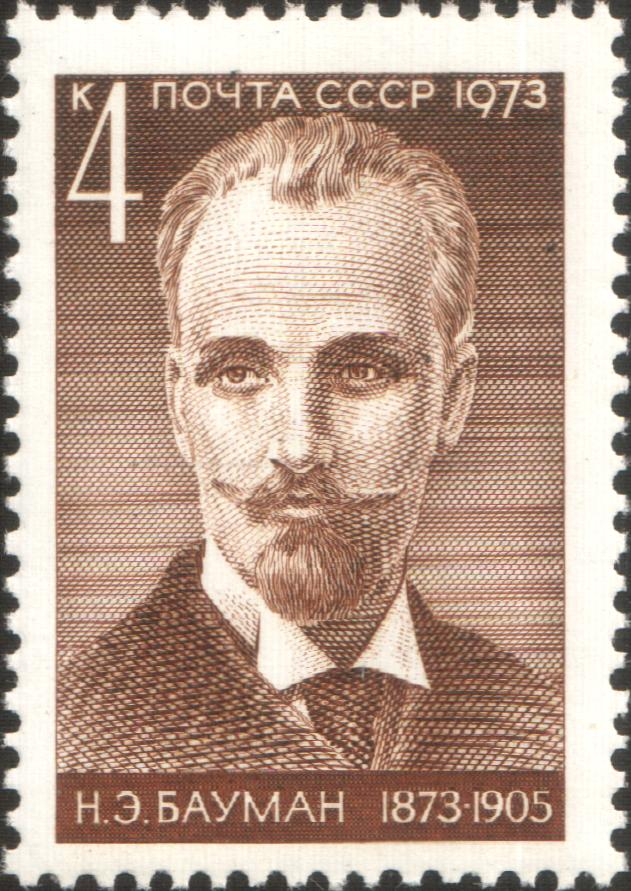
Soviet stamp (1973)

Due to decommunization policies the street named after Bauman in (Ukraine's capital) Kyiv was renamed after Janusz Korczak in 2016.

A steamship, SS Nikolay Bauman, was named for him. He was the subject of the 1967 film Nikolay Bauman.

=== Modern appraisal ===
Historian Orlando Figes, contends that Bauman was quite unworthy of the 'inflated honours' given him after his death, due to his cruel history of practical jokes; he also notes how his martyrdom cleansed the memory of him.

== Bibliography ==
- Figes, Orlando (2014). A People's Tragedy: The Russian Revolution 1891–1924. London: The Bodley Head. ISBN 9781847922915.
