= Mikhail Mikhailovich Golitsyn (field marshal) =

Russian field marshal (1675–1730)

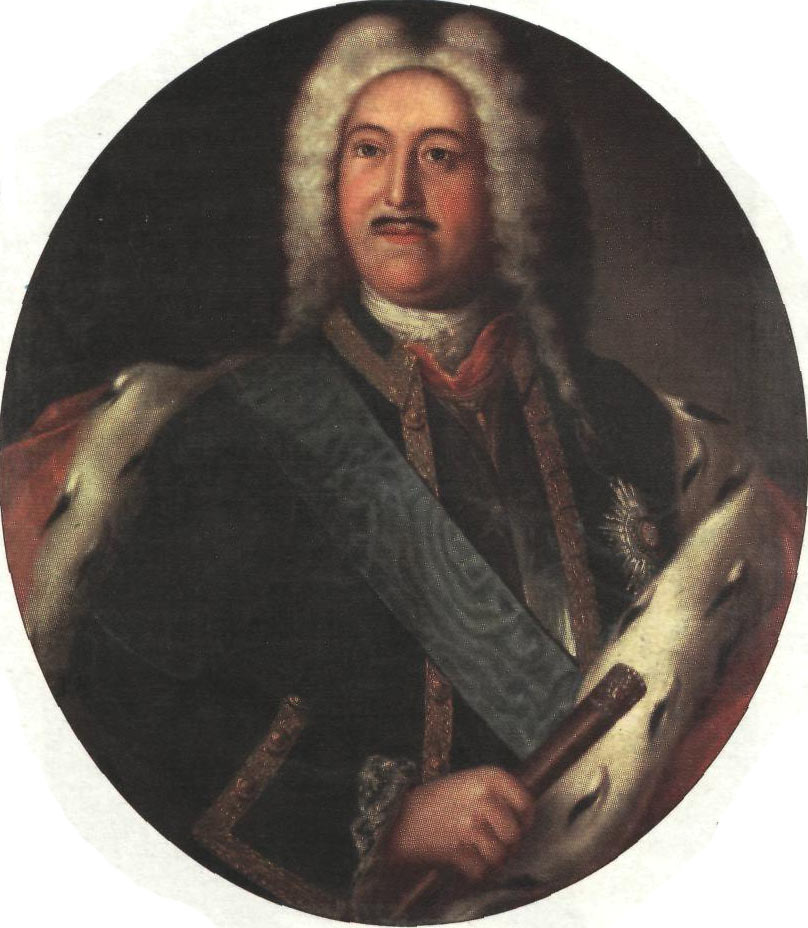
Mikhail Mikhailovitch Golitsyn

Prince Mikhail Mikhailovich Golitsyn or Galitzin (Russian: Михаи́л Миха́йлович Голи́цын; 11 November [O.S. 1 November] 1675, in Moscow – 21 December [O.S. 10 December] 1730) was a Russian field marshal (1725) and the president of the College of War (1728–1730). He was from the House of Golitsyn.

== Career ==
He was the son of Mikhail Andreyevich Golitsyn and spouse of Tatyana Borisovna Golitsyna.

He fought the Swedish Empire at the battles of Dobroye, Lesnaya, Pälkäne, Napue and Grengam.

Golitsyn was the governor of Finland (1714–1721) during the Great Wrath. From 1728, he was a member of the Supreme Privy Council.

== Legacy ==
The Millennium of Russia in Veliky Novgorod contains a sculpture of Golitsyn. Asteroid 7161 Golitsyn was named after him. Bauman Garden was established on the grounds of his Moscow mansion.

== Sources ==
- "Голицыны, русские полководцы и государственные деятели" . Brockhaus and Efron Encyclopedic Dictionary (in Russian). 1906.
