= Vladimir Rubin =

Russian composer (1924–2019)

Vladimir Ilich Rubin (Russian: Владимир Ильич Ру́бин; 5 August 1924 – 27 October 2019) was a Soviet and Russian composer. He was born in Moscow, and was a People's Artist of Russia (1995).

== Works ==
- Opera – Three Fat Men
