= Baumanskaya (Moscow Metro) =

Moscow Metro station

Baumanskaya Бауманская
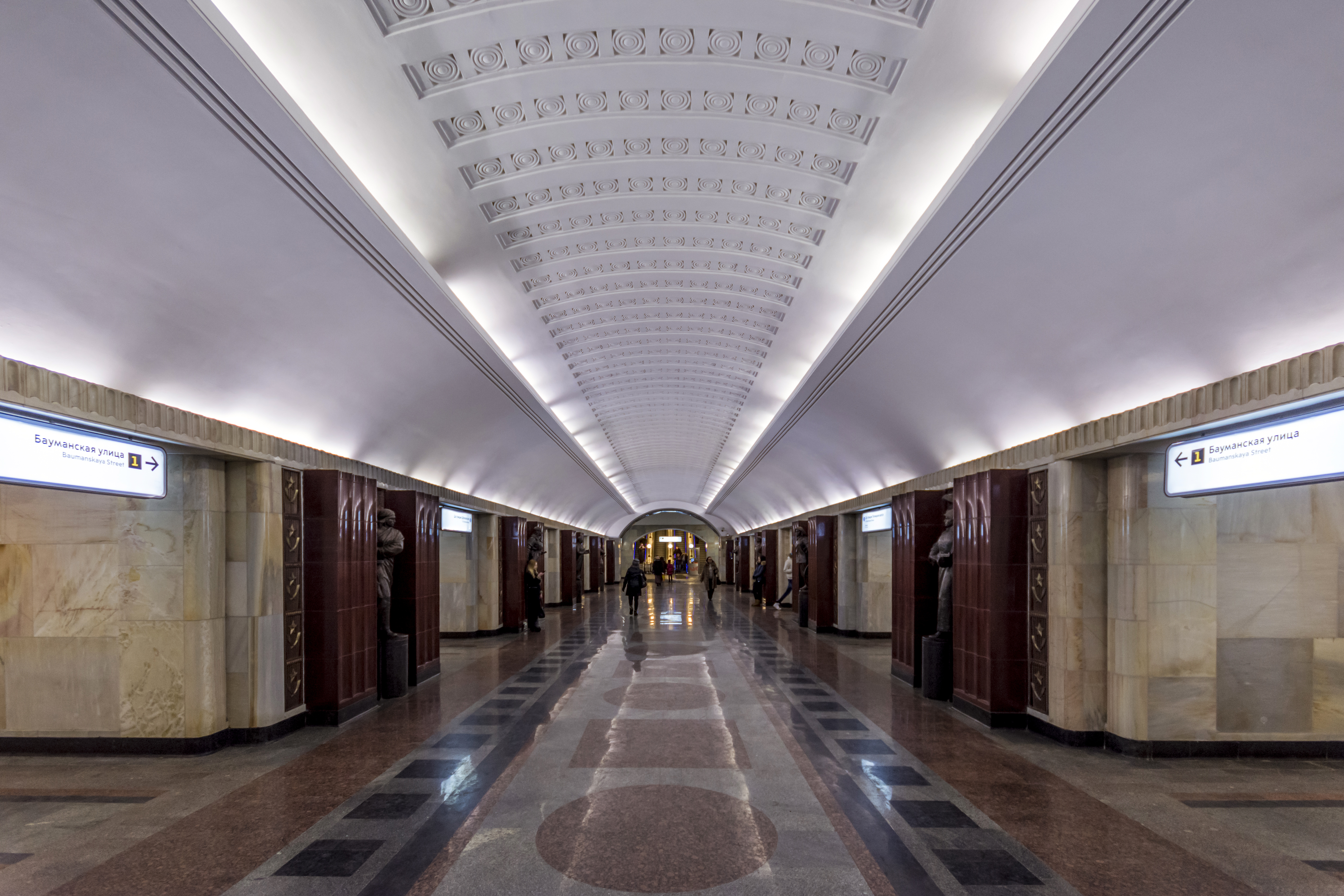

General information
- Location: Basmanny District; Central Administrative Okrug; Moscow; Russia
- Coordinates: 55.7730°N 37.6806°E
- System: Moscow Metro station
- Owner: Moskovsky Metropoliten
- Line: Arbatsko-Pokrovskaya line
- Platforms: 1
- Tracks: 2

Construction
- Depth: 32.5 metres (107 ft)
- Platform levels: 1
- Parking: No

Other information
- Station code: 047

History
- Opened: 18 January 1944; 82 years ago 24 December 2015; 10 years ago (reopening)
- Closed: 8 February 2015; 11 years ago (reconstruction)

Services
Preceding station	Moscow Metro	Following station
Kurskaya towards Pyatnitskoye Shosse	Arbatsko-Pokrovskaya line	Elektrozavodskaya towards Shchyolkovskaya
Route map
Location
- Location within Moscow Metro

Baumanskaya (Russian: Бауманская) is a station on the Arbatsko-Pokrovskaya Line of the Moscow Metro, named after the revolutionary Nikolai Bauman. It was designed by Boris Iofan and Yury Zenkevich and opened in 1944. The Art Deco design features white marble pylons with rounded corners, projecting, fluted piers faced with red ceramic tile, and decorative ventilation grilles. In the bays between each set of piers are bronze sculptures by V.A. Andreev depicting Russian soldiers and workers of the home front during World War II. At the end of the platform is a mosaic portrait of Vladimir Lenin. This station is very busy, as one of the biggest Moscow institutes (Moscow State Technical University) is located not far away.

The station was closed in 2015 for repairs, maintenance and escalator shaft replacement. The escalators at Baumanskaya were the oldest on the network, having operated non-stop since 1944. They were the last H-series escalators in operation on the whole network.

== Passenger traffic ==
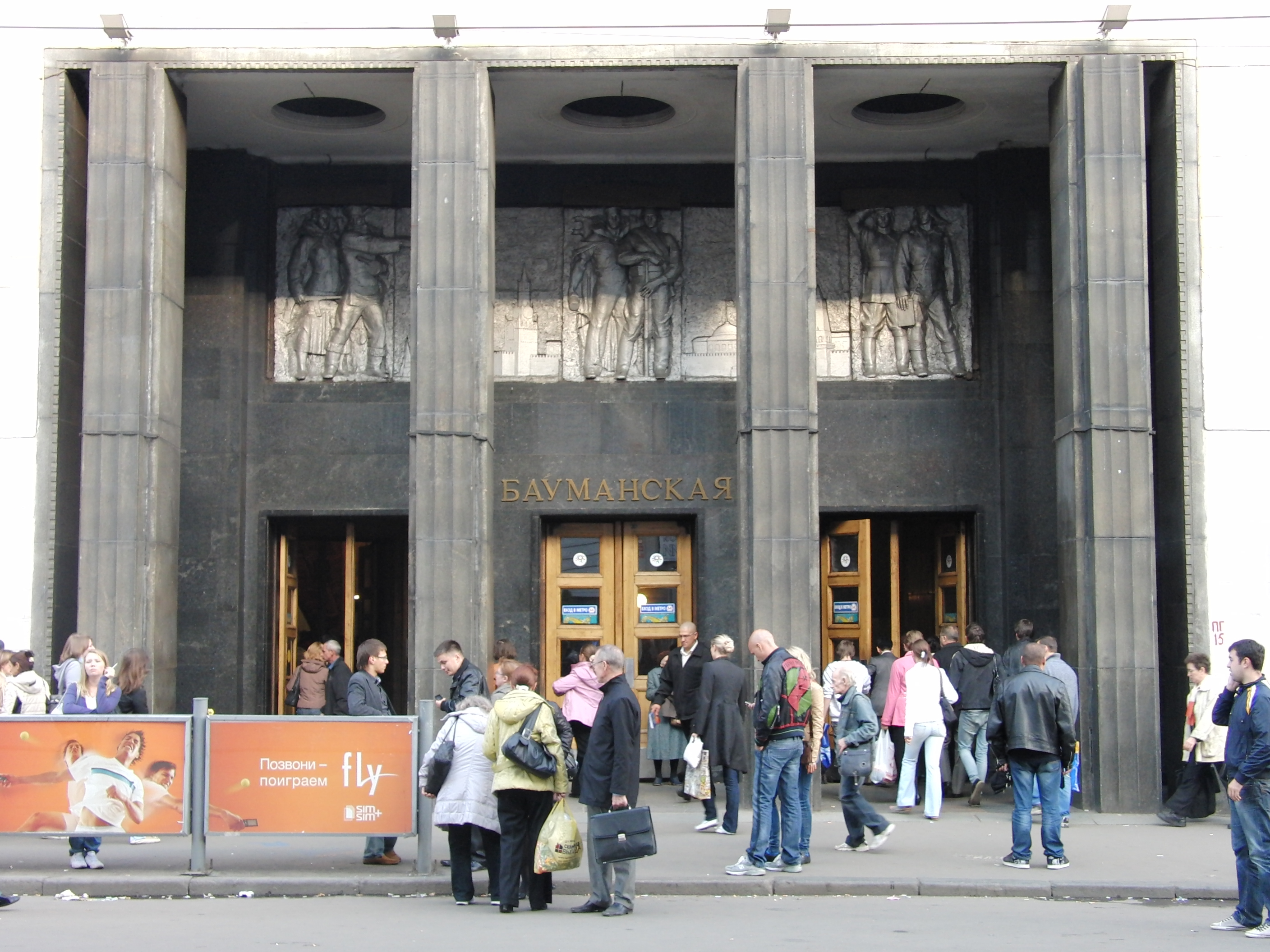
Vestibule of the station

Baumanskaya is the second busiest station in Moscow Metro. The facts:

- There are at least 3 major universities near the station: Bauman Moscow State Technical University main and secondary buildings Moscow State University of Civil Engineering and Moscow State Academy of Law.
- Specific configuration of central hall like garmon (Russian accordion) before the escalator, where some passengers try to short jump queue.
- Most passengers prefer Baumanskaya to other station if they would get to the area which is at half-way between Baumanskaya and another station even if causes additional transfer or even best accessible by ground transport.
- One of sculptures in station hall
  The escalators here were the oldest working in Moscow Metro and the entire world. Their replacement began on 8 February 2015 and was completed on 24 December 2015.

== Inscription ==
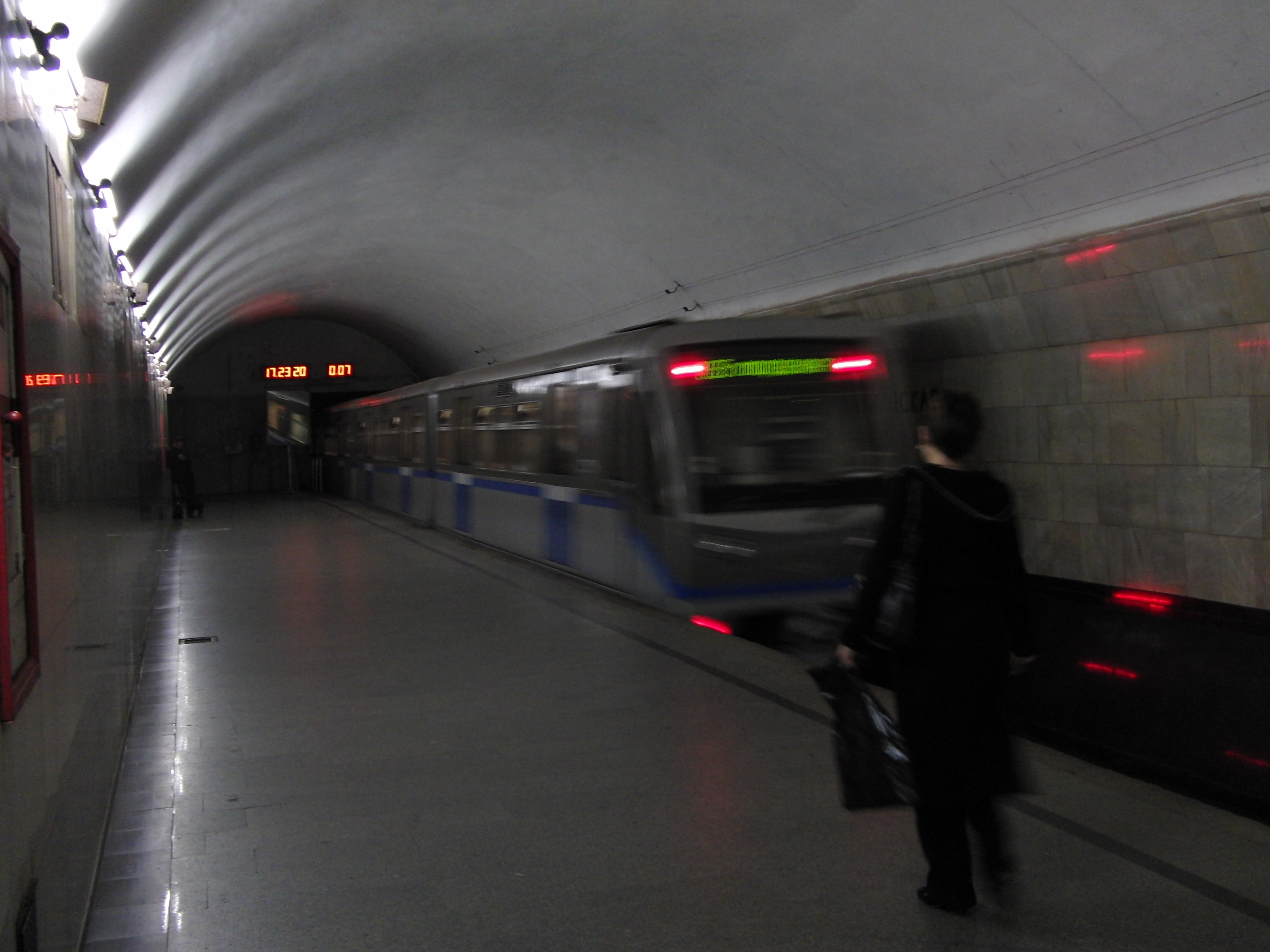
Station platform with incoming train

A cryptic inscription is on the wall of station. It is situated near the first car stop towards the Shchyolkovskaya station just under the last ventilation lattice. The inscription is deeply carved in marble on about 120 centimetres (47 in) above the floor, is about 8 centimetres (3.1 in) in length and 1.5 centimetres (0.59 in) in height. It consists of two dates, divided by hyphen:

19 14/XI 46 – 19 15/XII 54

These dates translate to 14 November 1946 – 15 December 1954. The way of writing is very similar to the way dates are written on gravestones. The origin of that artifact is unknown.
