= 1882 in music =

Events in the year 1882 in music.

== Specific locations ==
- 1882 in Finnish music
- 1882 in Norwegian music
- 1882 in Swedish music

== Events ==
- January – Richard Wagner completes his opera Parsifal
- July 26 – Wagner's Parsifal is premièred at the Bayreuth Festspielhaus under the baton of Hermann Levi with the tenor Hermann Winkelmann in the title rôle and Engelbert Humperdinck assisting in the production
- August 8–20 – Tchaikovsky's 1812 Overture is premièred in a tent near the (at this time) unfinished Cathedral of Christ the Saviour in Moscow under the baton of Ippolit Al'tani
- Gustav Mahler is employed at Olomouc
- Richard Strauss enters the Ludwig-Maximilians-Universität München

== Published popular music ==
- "Baa! Baa! Baa!" (w. Walter Greenaway m. Vincent Davies)
- "The Band Quartette" by Charles A. White
- "Bow, Bow, Ye Lower Middle Classes" (w. W. S. Gilbert m. Arthur Sullivan)
- "Goodbye, My Lover, Goodbye" (trad Eng)
- "In My Fust 'Usband's Time" (w.m. Harry Nicholls)
- "The Old Miser" by Charles A. White
- Les Patineurs (waltz) ("The Skaters' Waltz") (m. Emile Waldteufel)
- "Sweet Violets" by Joseph Emmet
- "Up Went The Price" (w.m. George Ware)
- From the score of Iolanthe:
  - "I'm Very Much Pained" (w. W. S. Gilbert m. Arthur Sullivan)
  - "Loudly Let The Trumpets Bray" (w. W. S. Gilbert m. Arthur Sullivan)
  - "The Nightmare Song" (w. W. S. Gilbert m. Arthur Sullivan)
  - "None Shall Part Us" (w. W. S. Gilbert m. Arthur Sullivan)
  - "Oh, Foolish Fay" (w. W. S. Gilbert m. Arthur Sullivan)
  - "Tho' P'raps I May Incur Your Blame" (w. W. S. Gilbert m. Arthur Sullivan)
  - "Though The Views Of The House Have Diverged" (w. W. S. Gilbert m. Arthur Sullivan)
  - "Tripping Hither, Tripping Thither" (w. W. S. Gilbert m. Arthur Sullivan)
  - "Welcome To Our Hearts Again" (w. W. S. Gilbert m. Arthur Sullivan)
  - "When All Night Long A Chap Remains" (w. W. S. Gilbert m. Arthur Sullivan)
  - "When Britain Really Ruled The Waves" (w. W. S. Gilbert m. Arthur Sullivan)
  - "When I Went To The Bar" (w. W. S. Gilbert m. Arthur Sullivan)

== Classical music ==
- Alexander Glazunov – String Quartet No. 1
- Charles Gounod – The Redemption (oratorio)
- Hans Huber – Symphony no. 1 "Wilhelm Tell"
- Mikhail Ippolitov-Ivanov – Yar-khmel (Spring Overture)
- Camille Saint-Saëns – Deux chœurs, for mixed chorus with piano ad libitum
- Pablo de Sarasate – Spanish Dances for violin and piano, Book IV
- Bedřich Smetana – String Quartet no. 2
- Johann Strauss – Voices of Spring
- Sergey Taneyev – Overture on a Russian Theme

== Opera ==
- Friedrich Lux – Der Schmied von Ruhla, Stadtheater, Mainz, 28 March
- Adolf Neuendorff – Don Quixote
- Nikolai Rimsky-Korsakov – The Snow Maiden, Mariinsky Theatre, Saint Petersburg, 29 January 1882 (OS; 10 February NS)
- Camille Saint-Saëns – Henry VIII
- Richard Wagner – Parsifal, Bayreuth Festspielhaus, 26 July

== Musical theater ==
- Der Bettelstudent (The Beggar Student), Vienna production
- The Grand Mogul, Broadway production
- Iolanthe (Music: Sir Arthur Sullivan Book and Lyrics: W. S. Gilbert); London production opened at the Savoy Theatre on November 25 and ran for 398 performances
- Iolanthe, Broadway production opened at the Standard Theatre on December 1
- The Queen's Lace Handkerchief, Broadway production opened at the Casino Theatre on October 21 and ran for 571 performances
- The Smugglers (musical), Broadway production

== Births ==
- January 15 – Henry Burr, popular tenor, prolific early recording artist (d. 1941)
- January 17 – Ida Barr, born Maud Barlow, music hall/ragtime singer (d. 1967)
- February 11
  - Gheorghe Cucu composer (d. 1932)
  - Joe Jordan, musician and composer (d. 1971)
- February 17 – Kurt Schindler, composer (died 1935)
- February 28 – Geraldine Farrar, operatic soprano (d. 1967)
- March 5 – Pauline Donalda, operatic soprano (d. 1970)
- March 18 – Gian Francesco Malipiero, composer and musicologist (d. 1973)
- March 24 – Gino Marinuzzi, conductor and composer (d. 1945)
- April 4 – Mary Howe, composer and pianist (d. 1964)
- April 17 – Artur Schnabel, pianist (d. 1951)
- April 18 – Leopold Stokowski, conductor (d. 1977)
- April 23 – Albert Coates, conductor and composer (d. 1953)
- April 24 – Albert Valsien, conductor and composer (d. 1955)
- May 6 – Georgi Atanasov, composer (d. 1931)
- May 11 – Joseph Marx, composer and critic (d. 1964)
- May 12 – Kyrylo Stetsenko, conductor, composer, critic and teacher (d. 1922)
- June 4 – Erwin Lendvai, composer and choral conductor (d. 1949)
- June 17 – Igor Stravinsky, composer (d. 1971)
- July 1 - Nicholas Laucella, concert flautist and composer (d. 1952)
- July 8 – Percy Grainger, composer (d. 1961)
- July 28 – Pavel Lamm, musicologist (d. 1951)
- August 13 – Georges Jean-Aubry, lyricist (died 1950)
- August 15 – Marion Bauer, composer (d. 1955)
- August 18 – Marcel Samuel-Rousseau, composer, organist and opera director (d. 1955)
- September 6 – John Powell, composer, pianist and ethnomusicologist (d. 1963)
- October 6 – Karol Szymanowski, pianist and composer (d. 1937)
- November 3 – G. H. Elliott, blackface music hall singer (d. 1962)
- November 10 – Rudi Gfaller, Austrian operetta singer and composer (d. 1972)
- November 26 –Tarquinia Tarquini, Italian soprano (d. 1976)
- December 8 – Manuel María Ponce, composer and music teacher (d. 1948)
- December 9 – Joaquín Turina, composer (d. 1949)
- December 16 – Zoltán Kodály, composer (d. 1967)

== Deaths ==
- February 3 – Guglielmo Quarenghi, composer (b. 1826)
- February 12 – Madame Céleste, dancer (b. 1815)
- February 16 – Julián Arcas, guitarist and composer (b. 1832)
- February 20 – Louis Adolphe le Doulcet, comte de Pontécoulant, soldier and musicologist (b. 1794)
- February 22 – Harriett Everard, singer and actress (b. 1844)
- February 27 – Alfred Jaëll, pianist (b. 1832)
- March 1 – Theodor Kullak, pianist and composer (b. 1818)
- March 16 – Mariia Surovshchikova-Petipa, ballerina (b. 1836)
- April 3 – Friedrich Wilhelm Kücken, composer and conductor (b. 1810)
- June 24 (or 25) – Joachim Raff, composer (b. 1822)
- June 28 – James Turle, organist and composer (b. 1802)
- July – John Zundel, organist, composer and arranger (b. 1815)
- July 4 – Joseph Brackett, songwriter (b. 1797)
- July 12 – Alfred Pease, composer and pianist (b. 1838)
- August 28 - Fred Godfrey, bandmaster and music arranger (b. 1837)
- September 16 – Theodore Eisfeld, conductor (b. 1816)
- October 3 – Adelaide Phillips, contralto singer (b. 1833)
- October 22 – Oskar Ahnfelt, composer of hymn-tunes (b. 1813)
- October 27 – Adolphe Gutmann, composer (b. 1819)
- October 29 – Gustav Nottebohm, composer and music editor (b. 1817)
- November 2 – Cenobio Paniagua, composer (b. 1821)
- November 18 – Aleksander Mirecki, marischal and violinist (b. 1809)
- November 20 – Kéler Béla, composer and conductor (b. 1820)
- December 29 – Josabeth Sjöberg, painter and music teacher (b. 1812)
- date unknown
  - Edward Mack, composer (b. 1826)
  - Konstantin Vilboa, composer (b. 1817)
