= 1881 in Icelandic music =

| List of years in Icelandic music |
- … 1871; 1872; 1873; 1874; 1875; 1876; 1877; 1878; 1879; 1880; 1881; 1882; 1883; 1884; 1885; 1886; 1887; 1888; 1889; 1890; 1891 …
- Art; Archaeology; Architecture; Literature; Music; Philosophy; Science; +...

The following is a list of notable events of the year 1881 in Icelandic music.

== Births ==
- 13 January – Sigvaldi Kaldalóns, Icelandic composer (died 1946)

== See also ==
- 1881 in Danish music
- 1881 in Norwegian music
- 1881 in Swedish music
- 1880s in Finnish music
