= 1881 in music =

This article is about music-related events in 1881.

== Specific locations ==
- 1881 in Icelandic music
- 1881 in Norwegian music

== Events ==
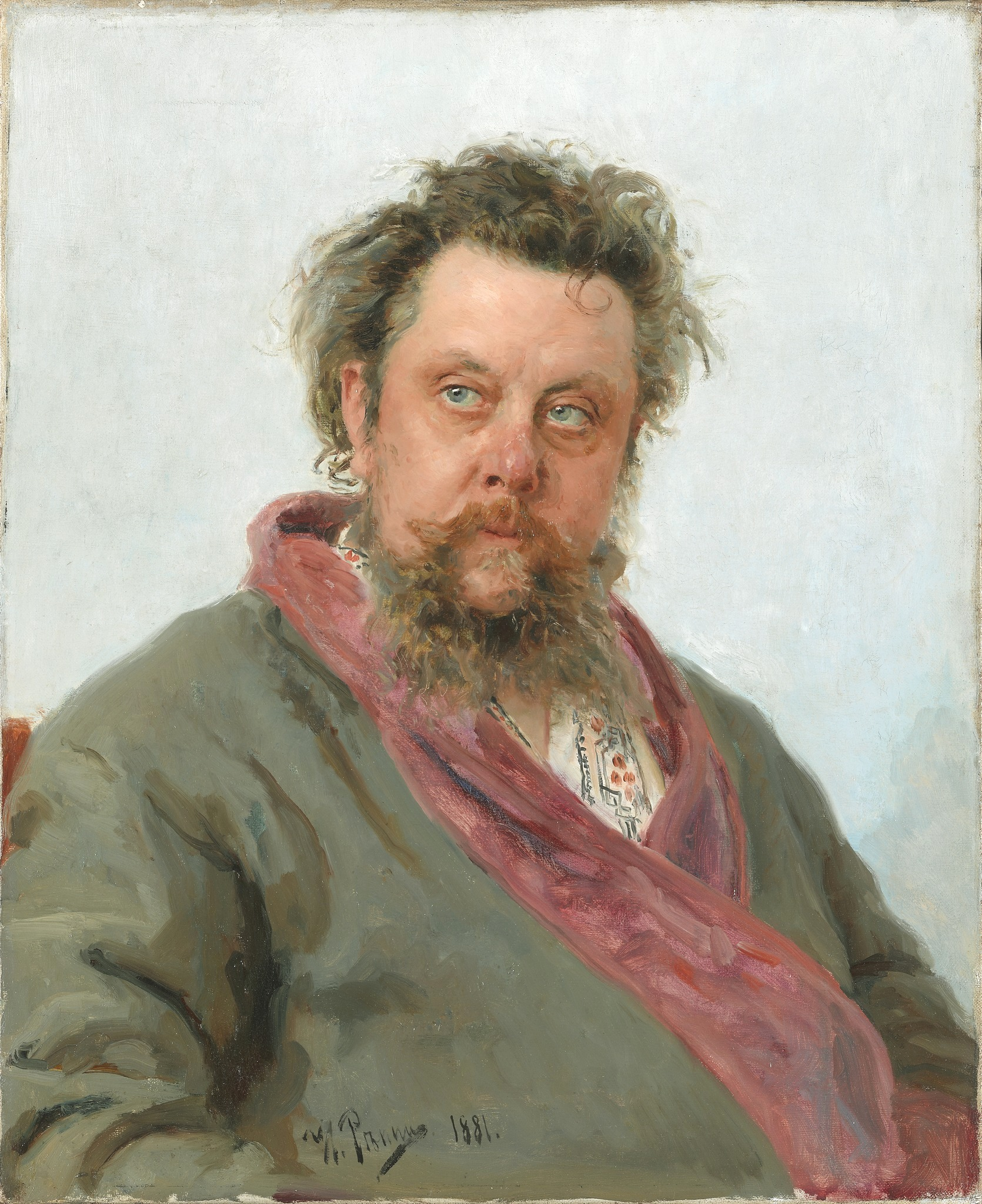
Ilya Repin's celebrated portrait of Mussorgsky, painted 2–5 March 1881, only a few days before the composer's death

- March 23 – A fire caused by a gas explosion destroys the Opéra de Nice in the south of France with fatalities
- February 10 – Offenbach's Tales of Hoffmann debuts in Paris
- February 20 – Anton Bruckner's Symphony No. 4 is given its public premiere in Vienna under the baton of Hans Richter
- June 11 – The National Theatre (Prague) receives a royal opening with the premiere of Smetana's opera Libuše (written 1871–72); however, a subsequent fire delays public opening for a further 2 years, when the same work reinaugurates the theatre
- September 3 – Anton Bruckner completes his Symphony No. 6; it will not be performed complete during the composer's lifetime
- November 9 – Johannes Brahms' Piano Concerto No. 2 is given its public premiere in Budapest with the composer as soloist
- December 4 – Pyotr Ilyich Tchaikovsky's Violin Concerto is premiered in Vienna with Adolph Brodsky as soloist

== Bands formed ==
- Brighouse and Rastrick Brass Band

== Published popular music ==
- "Good Bye!" by Francesco Paolo Tosti
- "My Bonnie Lies over the Ocean"
- "Slowly and Sadly" (President Garfield Memorial Tribute)" by Arabella M. Root

== Classical music ==
- Victor Bendix – Symphony No. 1 in C op. 16 Mountain Climbing
- Alexander Borodin – String Quartet No. 2 in D
- Johannes Brahms
  - Tragic Overture op. 81 revised; Nänie op. 82
  - Piano Concerto No. 2 Op. 83
- Max Bruch – Kol Nidre for cello and orchestra finished
- Anton Bruckner – Symphony No. 6 (Bruckner)
- Emmanuel Chabrier – Pièces pittoresques for piano
- Ernest Chausson – Piano Trio in G minor, op. 3
- Gabriel Fauré & André Messager – Messe des pêcheurs de Villerville
- César Franck – Rébecca (oratorio)
- Robert Fuchs – Cello Sonata No.1, Op.29
- Franz Liszt – Nuages Gris
- Giuseppe Martucci – Fantasia for piano op. 51
- Camille Saint-Saëns – Hymne à Victor Hugo
- Eduard Strauss
  - Glockensignale, Op.198
  - Schleier und Krone, Op.200
- Richard Strauss
  - String Quartet in A major, Op.2
  - 5 Klavierstücke, Op.3
  - Cello Sonata, Op.6
- Charles-Marie Widor – First Sonata for Piano and Violin op. 50 ()
- Bernard Zweers – Symphony No. 1 in D major
- Władysław Żeleński – 2 Mazurkas, Op.31

== Opera ==
- The Tales of Hoffmann (Les contes d'Hoffmann; Jacques Offenbach) – Paris production opened at the Opéra-Comique on February 10
- Johann Strauss Jr. – Der lustige Krieg, premiered November 24 in Vienna
- Pyotr Ilyich Tchaikovsky – The Maid of Orleans
- Giuseppe Verdi – Simon Boccanegra, revised version of the 21st Verdi opera premieres at La Scala in Milan

== Musical theater ==
- The Mascot (translation of Edmond Audran's La Mascotte) – Broadway production opened at the Bijou Theatre (Manhattan) on May 5
- Patience (Gilbert and Sullivan) – London production opened at the Opera Comique on April 23 and transferred to the new Savoy Theatre on October 10 for a total run of 578 performances

== Births ==
- January 4 – Nikolai Roslavets, Ukrainian composer (d. 1944)
- February 6 – Karl Weigl, Austrian composer (d. 1949)
- February 12 – Anna Pavlova, Russian ballerina and actress (d. 1931)
- February 21 – Kenneth J. Alford, English band composer (d. 1945)
- March 10 – Frank Mullings, English tenor (d. 1953)
- March 16 – Fannie Charles Dillon, American composer (d. 1947)
- March 18 – Paul Le Flem, French composer (d. 1984)
- March 23 – Egon Petri, Dutch-born pianist (d. 1962)
- March 25 – Béla Bartók, Hungarian composer (d. 1945)
- April 15 – David Thomas, Welsh composer (d. 1928)
- April 17 – Anton Wildgans, lyricist and playwright (died 1942)
- April 20 – Nikolai Myaskovsky, Polish-born Russian composer and teacher (d. 1950)
- May 11 – Jan van Gilse, Dutch composer (d. 1944)
- May 29 – Frederick Septimus Kelly, Australian-born musician (k. 1916)
- July 6 – Nancy Dalberg, Danish composer (d. 1949)
- August 15 – Ted Snyder, American composer and music publisher (d. 1965)
- August 18 – Hermann Zilcher, German composer (died 1948)
- August 19 – George Enescu, Romanian composer (d. 1955)
- August 29 – Edvin Kallstenius, Swedish composer (d. 1967)
- November 22 – Ethel Levey, American singer, dancer and actress (d. 1955)
- November 28 – Stefan Zweig, Austrian librettist of Richard Strauss's Die schweigsame Frau (suicide 1942)
- December 3 – Henry Fillmore, American band composer (d. 1956)
- December 24 – Charles Wakefield Cadman, American composer and songwriter (d. 1946)

== Deaths ==
- January 30 – Jacques-Nicolas Lemmens, Belgian, organist and composer, 58
- March 13 – Sophie Daguin, ballerina and choreographer, 79
- March 23 – Nikolai Rubinstein, pianist and composer, 45
- March 28 – Modest Mussorgsky, composer, 42 (alcohol-related)
- June 5 – Franjo Krežma, violinist and composer, 18 (tuberculosis)
- June 6 – Henri Vieuxtemps, composer, 61
- June 7 – Marie Gabriel Augustin Savard, music teacher and composer, 66
- July 3 – Achille De Bassini, operatic baritone, 62
- September 7 – Sidney Lanier, poet and flautist, 39 (tuberculosis)
- October 9 – Richard Wüerst, composer and music teacher, 57
- November 25 – Theobald Boehm, inventor of the modern flute, 87
- December 17 – Giulio Briccialdi, composer, 63
- December 30 – Corrado Miraglia, opera singer, 60
- date unknown – Francisco de Sá Noronha, violinist and composer (b. 1820)
