= Ruhla =

- Town
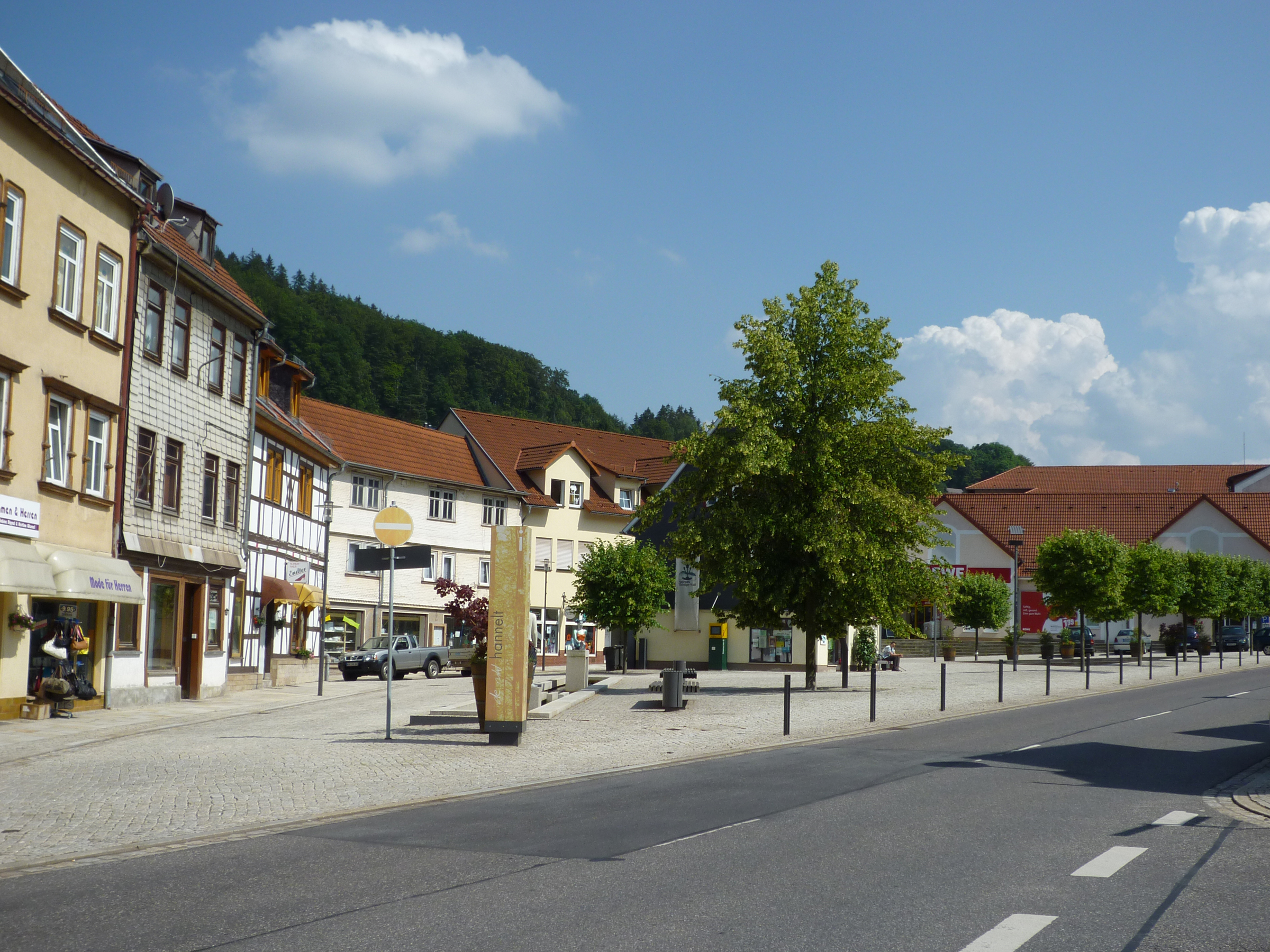
- Marketplace

- Coat of arms

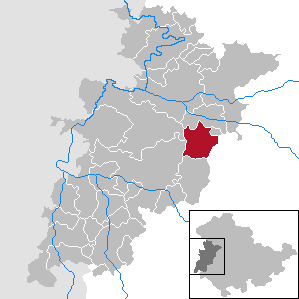
- Location in Wartburgkreis District
- Interactive map of Ruhla
- Location within Germany Location within Thuringia
- Coordinates: 50°53′31″N 10°22′0″E
- Country: Germany
- State: Thuringia
- District: Wartburgkreis
- Subdivisions: 3 Ortsteile

Government
  - Mayor (2024–30): Stefan Hartung (CDU)

Area
  - Total: 38.55 km^{2} (14.88 sq mi)
- Elevation: 440 m (1,440 ft)

Population (2025-12-31)
  - Total: 5,126
  - Density: 133.0/km^{2} (344.4/sq mi)
- Time zone: UTC+01:00 (CET)
  - Summer (DST): UTC+02:00 (CEST)
- Postal codes: 99842
- Dialling codes: 036929
- Vehicle registration: WAK, SLZ
- Website: www.ruhla.de

Ruhla (German pronunciation: [ˈʁuːla]) is a town situated in the forest of Thuringia in the district of Wartburgkreis in Germany, immediately next to the Rennsteig. Thal and Kittelsthal are parts of the town.

== History ==
Within the German Empire (1871-1918), part of Ruhla belonged to the Grand Duchy of Saxe-Weimar-Eisenach and part to the Duchy of Saxe-Coburg and Gotha.

== Culture and sights ==
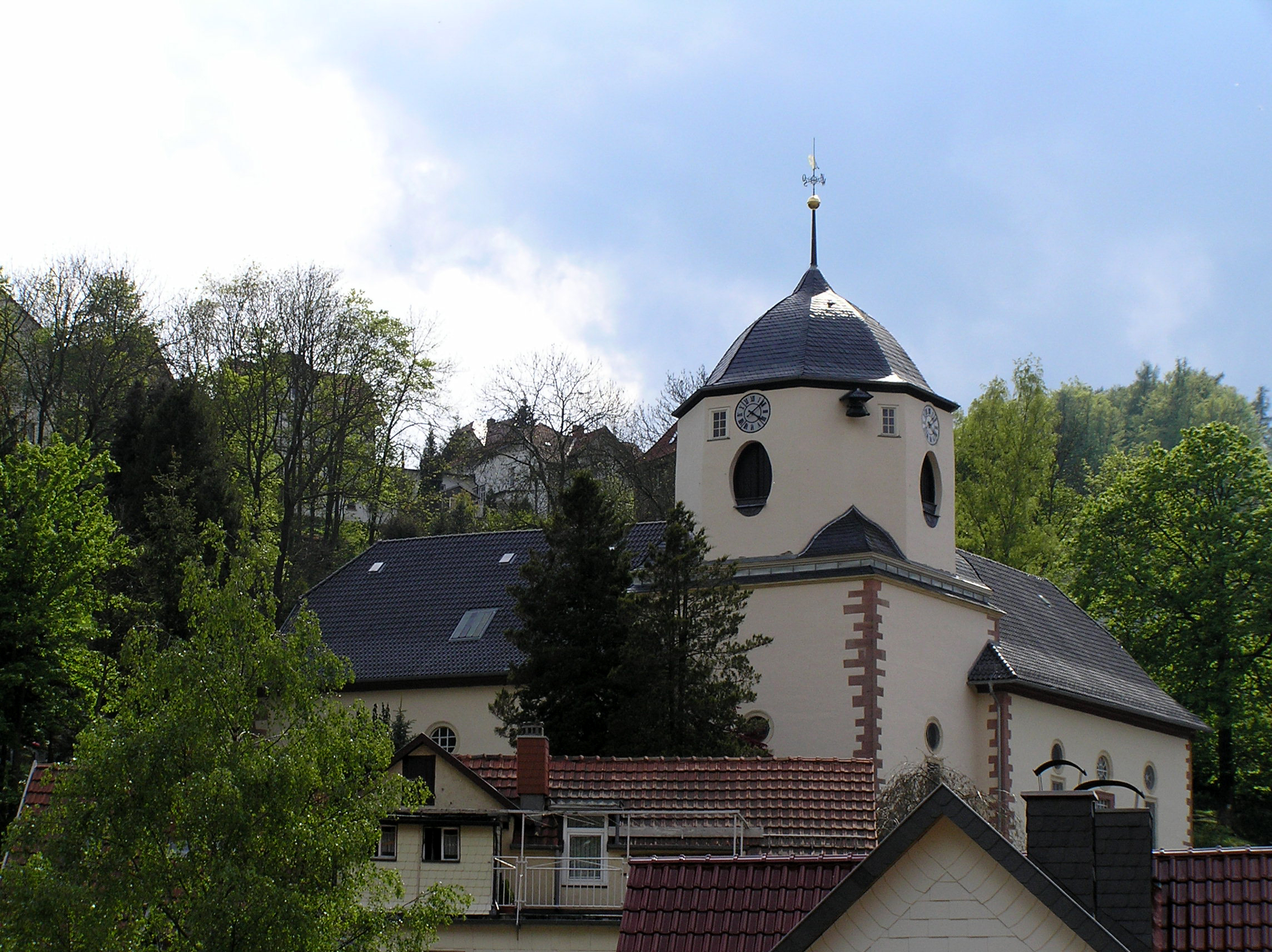
Church St. Concordia

=== Church of St. Concordia ===
The church was built in 1660-61 and has never been changed since then.

It is one of about eight angle churches in Germany and is considered to be among the two "real" angle churches, i.e. it was originally built as an angle church whereas the other churches only became angle churches after some reconstruction. The church consists of two wings that are situated at a right angle. Where the two wings meet there is the spire and the altar space from where both wings can be overlooked.

Since Ruhla was largely spared from destruction during World War I and II, St Concordia was not affected either. Hence it is the only angle church that has been conserved unaltered and in its original state since its first construction. Since 2004 it is home to the series "Kultur im Winkel" (Culture in the angle [of the church]).

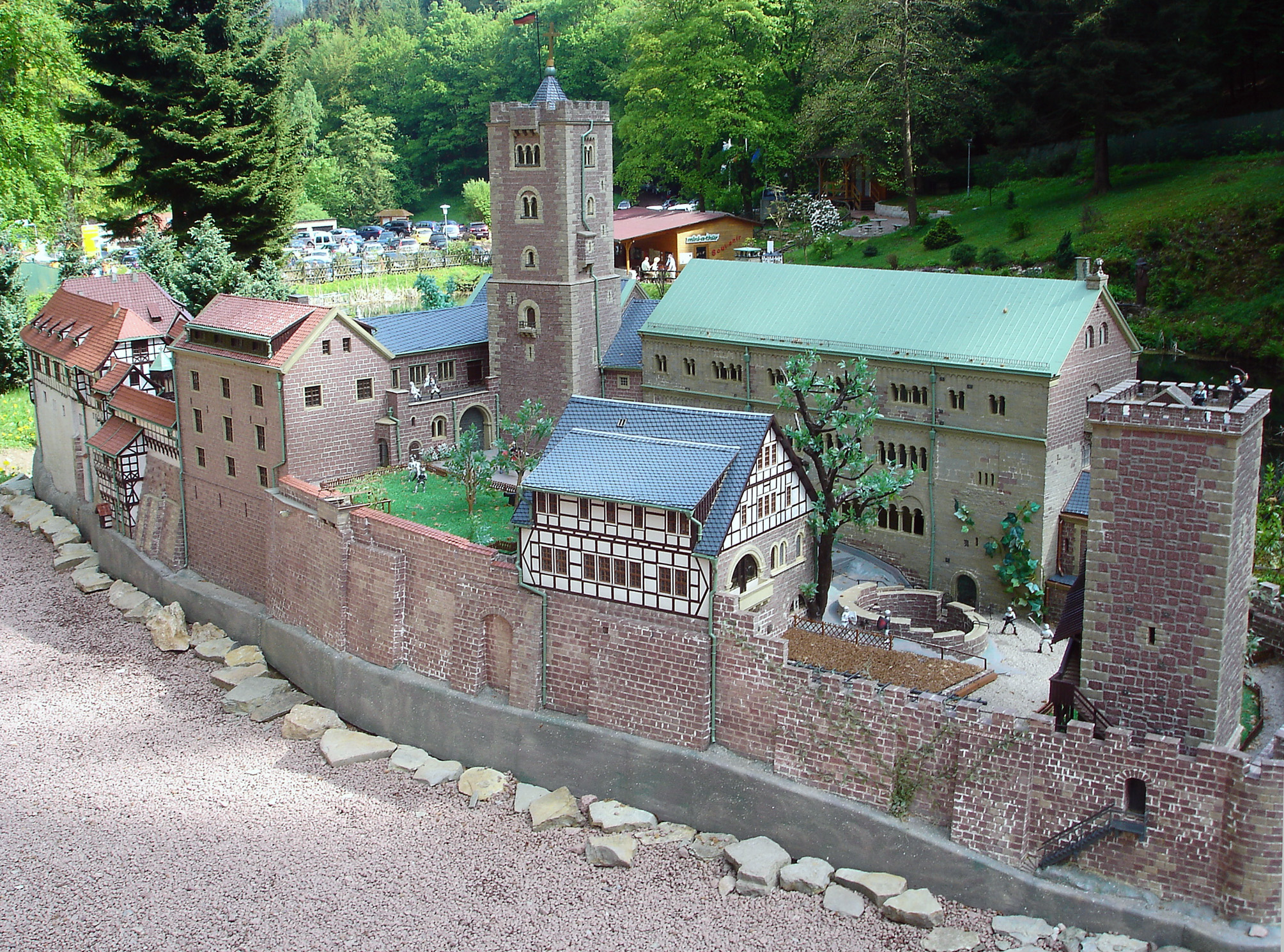
Model of the Wartburg

=== Mini-a-thür ===
The park mini-a-thür (derived from miniature and Thüringen, the German name for Thuringia) shows about 120 models of sights of Thuringia, among the Creuzburg, Erfurt Hauptbahnhof, the Planetarium Jena and the Wartburg.

It was the birthplace of the composer Friedrich Lux. One of his operas is called The Blacksmith of Ruhla.
