= Lundvik =

Lundvik is a Swedish surname. Notable people with the surname include:

- Hildor Lundvik (1885–1951), Swedish composer
- Jan Lundvik (born 1933), Swedish diplomat
- John Lundvik (born 1983), Swedish singer

== See also ==
- Lundvik, a fictional astronaut character played by Hermione Norris in "Kill the Moon" in the seventh episode of the eighth series of the British science fiction television programme Doctor Who.
