= Piano Concerto No. 5 (Beethoven) =

Beethoven's last completed piano concerto

Piano Concerto in E♭ major
- No. 5 (Emperor)
- by Ludwig van Beethoven
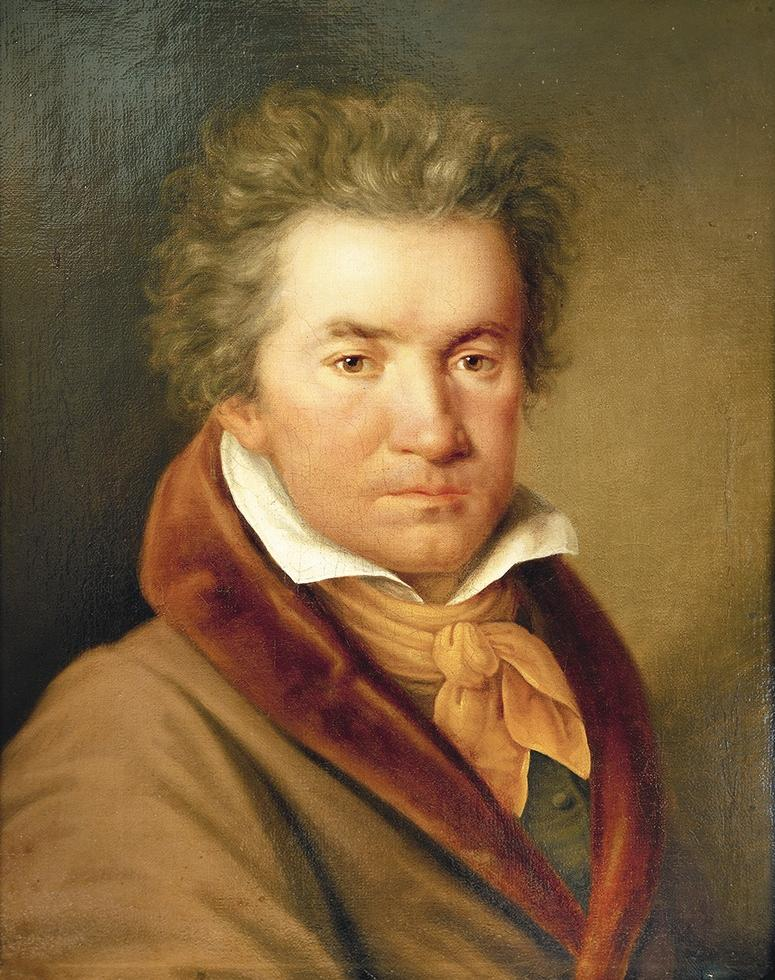
- Beethoven in 1815: portrait by Joseph Willibrord Mähler
- Key: E♭ major
- Opus: 73
- Composed: 1809
- Dedication: Archduke Rudolf
- Movements: Three

Premiere
- Date: 28 November 1811
- Location: Gewandhaus
- Conductor: Johann Philipp Christian Schulz
- Performers: Gewandhaus Orchestra; Friedrich Schneider (piano)

The Piano Concerto No. 5 in E♭ major, Op. 73, known as the Emperor Concerto in English-speaking countries, is a piano concerto composed by Ludwig van Beethoven. Beethoven composed the concerto in 1809 under salary in Vienna, and he dedicated it to Archduke Rudolf, who was his patron, friend, and pupil. Its public premiere was on 28 November 1811 in Leipzig, with Friedrich Schneider as the soloist and Johann Philipp Christian Schulz conducting the Gewandhaus Orchestra. Beethoven, usually the soloist, could not perform due to declining hearing.

The work's military aspects and symbolism characterize its heroic style. Beethoven used novel approaches with the piece, such as lengthening the concerto (it is approximately forty minutes long) and creating a new relationship between piano and orchestra. The first of its three movements, Allegro, is in sonata form and is longer than any opening movement of Beethoven's earlier piano concertos. The second movement, Adagio un poco mosso, is a nocturne that directly builds into the third movement. The last movement, Rondo: Allegro ma non troppo, is in seven-part rondo form.

The origin of the epithet Emperor is uncertain; it may have been coined by Johann Baptist Cramer, the English publisher of the concerto. The concerto has no association with any emperor, and according to Donald Tovey and Betsy Schwarm, Beethoven would have disliked it due to his disapproval of Napoleon's conquest.

As part of his repertoire, Franz Liszt frequently performed the concerto throughout his life. Since its first recording in 1912, it has been recorded numerous times by classical pianists.

== Background ==
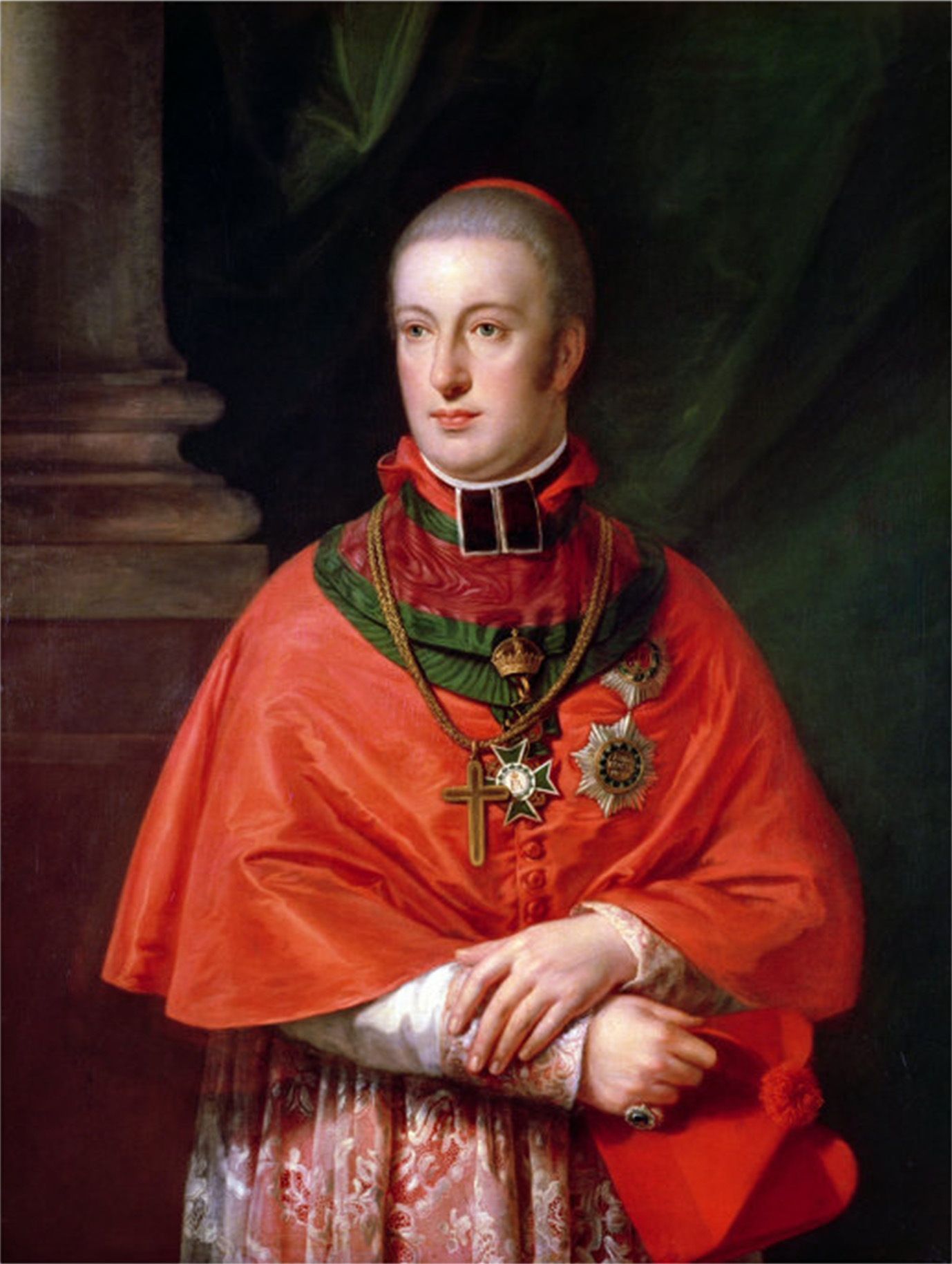
Beethoven's patron, Archduke Rudolf; portrait by Johann Baptist von Lampi

Beethoven's return to Vienna from Heiligenstadt in 1802 marked a change in musical style and is now often designated as the start of his middle or "heroic" period - characterized by many original works composed on a grand scale. In the autumn of 1808, after being rejected for a position at the Royal Theatre, Beethoven received an offer from Napoleon's brother Jérôme Bonaparte, the king of Westphalia, for a well-paid position as Kapellmeister at the court in Cassel. To persuade him to stay in Vienna, Archduke Rudolf, Prince Kinsky, and Prince Lobkowitz pledged to pay him a pension of 4000 florins a year. Archduke Rudolf paid his share of the salary on the agreed date. Kinsky, immediately called to military duty, did not contribute and died in November 1812 after falling from his horse. When the Austrian currency destabilized in 1811, Lobkowitz went bankrupt. To benefit from the agreement, Beethoven had to obtain recourse from the law, which in 1815 brought him some payment.

Beethoven felt the Napoleonic Wars reaching Vienna in early 1809 and completed writing the piano concerto in April while Vienna was under siege by Napoleon's armies. He wrote to his publisher in July 1809 that there was "nothing but drums, cannons, men, misery of all sorts" around him. To save his hearing, he fled to his brother's cellar and covered his ears with pillows. The work's heroic style reflects the war-ridden era in its military topics and heroic tone. Beethoven experimented with new techniques, such as the piano entrance beginning earlier than typical and with a cadenza.

The concerto's public premiere was on 28 November 1811 in Leipzig, with Friedrich Schneider as the soloist. Beethoven's hearing loss did not prevent him from composing music, but it made playing at concerts increasingly difficult. The concerto debuted in Vienna on 12 February 1812, with Carl Czerny, Beethoven's pupil, as the soloist. The English premiere was on 8 May 1820 with Charles Neate as soloist. Felix Mendelssohn gave an English performance on 24 June 1829. Archduke Rudolf of Austria was Beethoven's aristocratic patron, and in 1803 or 1804, Rudolf began studying piano and composition with Beethoven. They became friends, and their meetings continued until 1824. Beethoven dedicated many pieces to him, including this concerto.

The origins of the concerto's epithet, Emperor, are obscure and no consensus exists on its origin. An unlikely and unauthenticated story says that at the first Vienna performance, a French officer said, "C'est l'Empereur!" Other sources say that Johann Baptist Cramer coined it. According to Donald Tovey and Betsy Schwarm, Beethoven would have disliked the epithet due to his disapproval of Napoleon's conquest. Beethoven had previously reconsidered the dedication of his third symphony; initially dedicated to Napoleon, Beethoven changed it after Napoleon assumed the title of emperor in 1804. According to Yan Shen, musicologists agree that the concerto has no connection to an emperor.

== Music ==
=== Overview ===
Recording of the concerto by pianist Ursula Oppens and the DuPage Symphony Orchestra; from Musopen
I. Allegro

II. Adagio un poco mosso

III. Rondo: Allegro

The concerto is scored for two flutes, two oboes, two clarinets in B♭ (clarinet 1 playing in A in movement 2), two bassoons, two horns, two trumpets, timpani in E♭ and B♭, and strings. In the second movement, the 2nd flute, 2nd clarinet, trumpets, and timpani are tacet. The concerto is divided into the following three movements:

1. Allegro in E♭ major, (4/4)
2. Adagio un poco mosso (Note: The original autograph (page 74r) has Adagio un poco moto ("Adagio with a little motion"), not mosso.) in B major, (4/4)
3. Rondo: Allegro ma non troppo in E♭ major, (6/8)

Beethoven began innovating in the piano concerto genre with his third piano concerto and continued through his fifth piano concerto. While Wolfgang Amadeus Mozart's piano concertos consisted of the piano and orchestra working in tandem, in Beethoven's last two piano concertos, the pianist was the "hero," the dominant and directional soloist. Also, in Mozart's concertos, the soloist was a virtuoso and more important than the composer; in Beethoven's, the pianist is a vector for the composer. Beethoven created the tradition of linking movements in concertos, especially the middle and the last. Subsequent composers connected and transitioned through all movements in an attempt to create unity in a piece.

=== I. Allegro ===
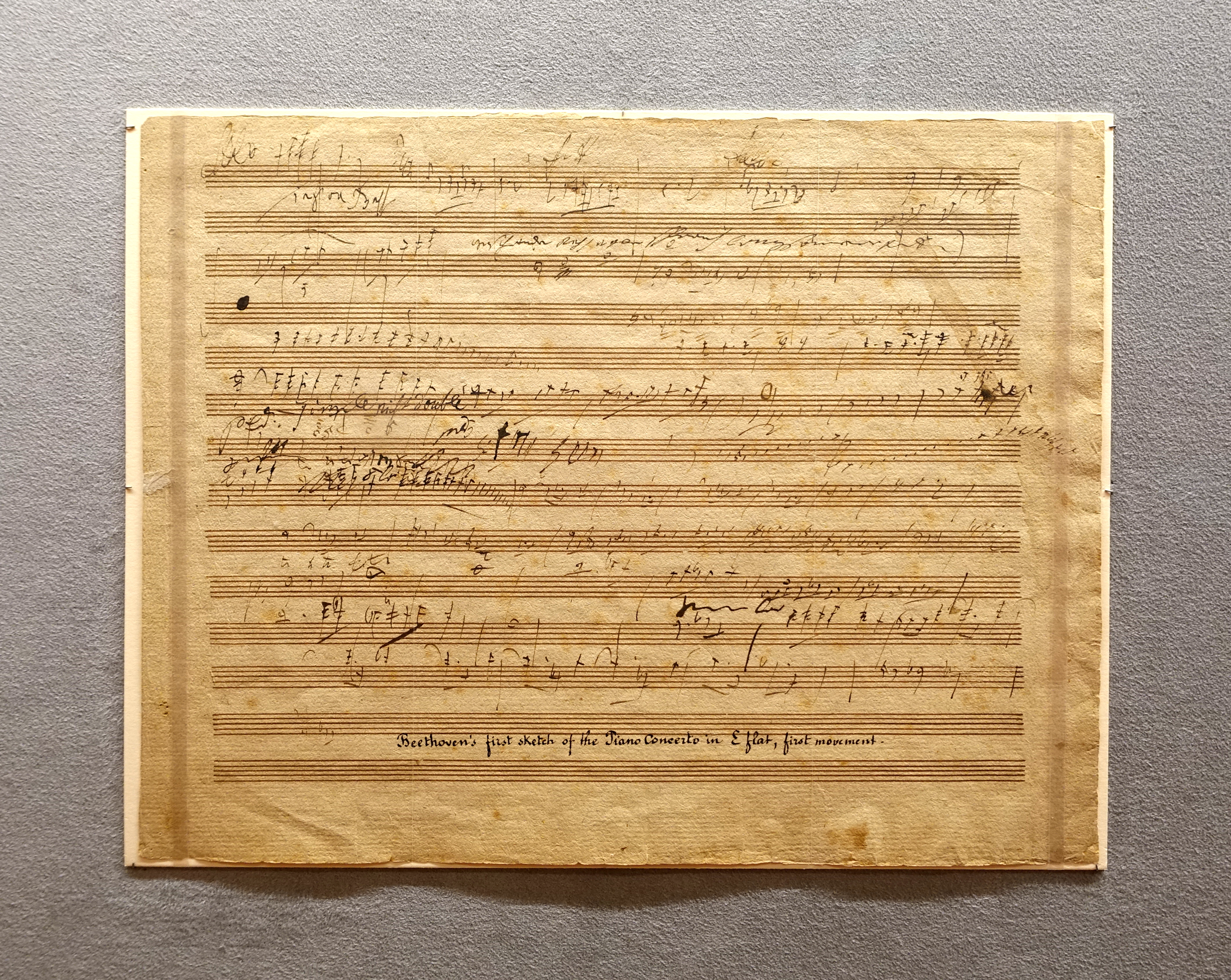
Sketches for the first movement of the Fifth Piano Concerto

The first movement is longer than any that Beethoven had previously composed in the piano concerto genre. Beethoven adhered to the traditional sonata form but significantly redefined the interaction between piano and orchestra. The opening section precedes an orchestral exposition, solo exposition, development, recapitulation, written cadenza, and a coda. Beethoven explicitly forbids the soloist from performing their own cadenza, a shift from previous piano concertos. Stephan Lindeman and William Kinderman have speculated that Beethoven wanted to control all aspects of the piece since he could not personally perform it or create a better flow without a virtuosic interruption. Following this piece, composers wrote cadenzas instead of leaving them to the performer.

The concerto opens with the orchestra offering three sonorous chords. The solo piano responds to each chord with flourishes of arpeggios, trills, and scales. This opening was new in classical concertos, and the flourishes almost became thematic.

The propulsive first theme follows, and the expository material repeats with variations, virtuoso figurations, and modified harmonies. The second theme, a march, appears first in B minor form in the strings, then thematically shifts to C♭ major by the horns. Throughout the movement, Beethoven transforms these themes into a range of keys, moods, and figurations. Following the opening, the movement follows Beethoven's three-theme sonata structure for a concerto. The orchestral exposition is a two-theme sonata exposition. The second exposition with the piano is interrupted twice by the orchestra, an innovation by Beethoven. The first interruption comes after the piano plays the first theme gently, in contrast to the orchestra's martial version, and the orchestra intervenes to play its martial version during the piano exposition. After the piano plays the second theme in the key of B, rather than in the traditional dominant key] of B♭, the orchestra comes in to play the second theme in B♭. Musicologist Robert Greenberg interpreted the development section of the first movement as a struggle for dominance between the piano and the orchestra. By the recapitulation, the piano and orchestra are playing coorperatively, rather than competing. The coda elaborates upon the open-ended first theme, building intensity before finishing with a final climactic arrival at the tonic E♭ major.

=== II. Adagio un poco mosso ===
The second movement in B major forms a quiet nocturne for the solo piano, muted strings, and wind instruments that converse with the solo piano. The movement briefly changes to D major, a very remote key from the concerto's E♭ major. The third movement begins without interruption when a lone bassoon note B drops a semitone to B♭, the dominant of the tonic key E♭. The end of the second movement builds directly into the third.

Beethoven uses B major as a “surprise” key for abrupt distant key relationships. This resolves to B♭ in the transition to the last movement.

=== III. Rondo: Allegro ma non troppo ===
Like the Appassionata sonata and the Violin Concerto, the score is notated with attacca to indicate little to no break with the previous movement which did not end with complete closure.

The final movement of the concerto is a seven-part hybrid between a sonata form and a rondo form (ABACABA). The solo piano introduces the main theme before the orchestra affirms the soloist's statement. The rondo's B-section begins with piano scales before the orchestra again responds. The C-section is much longer, presenting the theme from the A-section in three different keys before the piano performs a passage of arpeggios. Consistent with a sonata form, the C-section acts as a development of the main theme. Rather than finishing with a strong entrance from the orchestra, the trill ending the cadenza dies away until the introductory theme reappears, played first by the piano and then the orchestra. In the last section, the theme undergoes variation before the concerto ends with a short cadenza and robust orchestral response.

== Reception ==
Contemporary reception was positive, with reviews praising its originality and beauty. One review said:

In the exuberance of his genius, he almost never thinks of the ne quid nimium; (Note: Latin, "nothing in excess") he pursues his theme with tireless haste, not infrequently makes digressions which seem baroque, and thus, through exertion, he himself exhausts the eager attention of the weaker musical amateur, who cannot follow his train of thought.

— Robin Wallace, The Critical Reception of Beethoven's Compositions by His German Contemporaries, Op. 73 to Op. 85 (2018)

Criticism fell on the concerto's length, saying that its duration took away from its beauty.

The piece was a favorite of Franz Liszt. Liszt frequently performed the concerto throughout his life, including at an 1841 performance with Hector Berlioz conducting, at the unveiling of the Beethoven Monument in 1845, and at an 1877 all-Beethoven concert with Ferruccio Busoni in attendance. At the 1877 concert, Liszt played with nine fingers because of an injury to his left hand. Eleven-year-old Busoni was "bitterly disappointed" at his performance but was the only one who noticed.

The musicologist Alfred Einstein described the concerto as "the apotheosis of the military concept." He believed it was the sister work of Eroica because it evokes imagery of an emperor such as Napoleon. Alfred Brendel said it has "a grand and radiant vision, a noble vision of freedom." In the 1860 edition of his biography of Beethoven, Anton Schindler wrote that the concerto was "the summit of all concerto music ever written." Joseph Kerman stated it was a "triumph". As of 2021, it was the most performed piano concerto at Carnegie Hall, with 215 performances.

== Recordings ==
On 2 October 1912, Frank La Forge recorded the adagio movement with a studio orchestra for the Victor Talking Machine Company; the recording was issued as Victor 55030-A. In 1922, Frederic Lamond made the first complete recording with the Royal Albert Hall Orchestra under Eugene Goossens. In 1945, Walter Gieseking made a stereophonic tape recording for German radio with the Grosses Funkorchester under Artur Rother. It is one of the earliest stereo recordings and one of about 300 such recordings made during the war, of which five survived. During the quiet passages, anti-aircraft weapons can be heard. As part of complete recordings of Beethoven's piano concertos, Piano Concerto No. 5 was recorded by Claudio Arrau in 1958, Wilhelm Kempff in 1961, Vladimir Ashkenazy in 1972, Alicia de Larrocha in 1983, Hélène Grimaud in 2006, and Glenn Gould. Other recordings were done by Alfred Brendel in 1976, Friedrich Gulda in 1971, and Murray Perahia in 1986.
