= Friedrich Schneider =

German pianist, composer, organist and conductor (1786–1853)

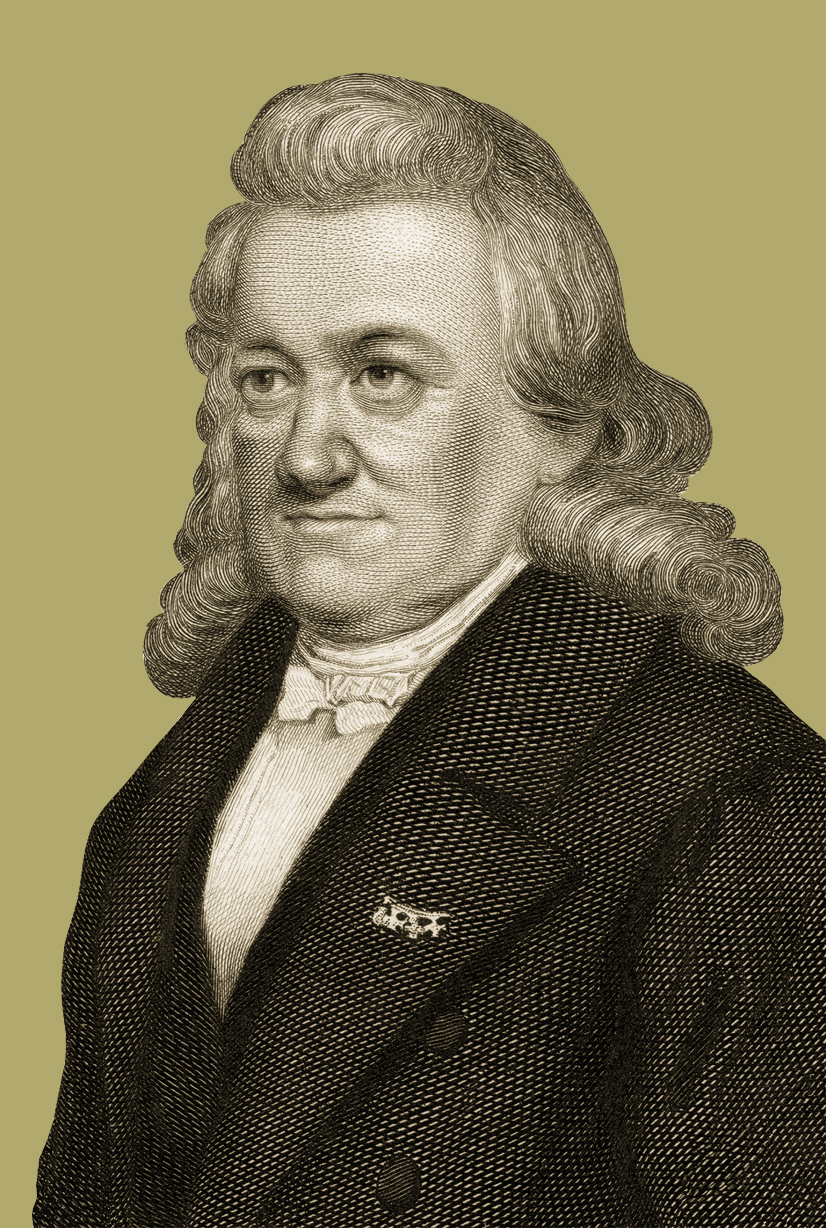
A steel engraving of Friedrich Schneider

Johann Christian Friedrich Schneider (3 January 1786 in Alt-Waltersdorf – 23 November 1853 in Dessau) was a German pianist, composer, organist, and conductor.

Schneider studied piano first with his father Johann Gottlob Schneider (senior), and then at the Zittau Gymnasium with Schönfelder and Unger. His first published works were a set of three piano sonatas in 1804. In 1805, he commenced studies at the University of Leipzig. He became an organist at St. Thomas Church, Leipzig in 1812, and was named conductor in Dessau in 1821. It is thought that Schneider premiered Ludwig van Beethoven's Piano Concerto No. 5 in Leipzig on 28 November 1811. In 1824, he was festival director of the Lower Rhenish Music Festival and his oratorio Die Sündflut was premiered during this event.

Schneider composed copiously. Among his works are seven operas, four masses, six oratorios, 25 cantatas, 23 symphonies, seven piano concertos, sonatas for violin, flute, and cello, and a great many shorter instrumental pieces, some of them for piano, some for organ. He also left numerous solo songs and part songs.

A projected cycle of four oratorios, Christus das Kind (1829), Christus der Meister (1827), and Christus der Erlöser (1838) were left uncompleted as Schneider did not set the fourth part Christus der Verherrlichte.

== Family and pupils ==
Friedrich Lux and Robert Volkmann were among Schneider's pupils. His brothers Johann Gottlob Schneider (junior; 1789-1864) and Johann Gottlieb Schneider (1797-1856) were likewise organists, the former achieving great fame and notability, with artistic connections to Mendelssohn, Liszt, Schumann and many others.

== Selected recordings ==
- Friedrich Schneider Das Weltgericht Martina Rüping, Marie Henriette Reinhold, Patrick Grahl, GewandhausChor Leipzig, Camerata Lipsiensis, Gregor Meyer 2CD 2019
- Schneider Christus das Kind (1829) Luken Ars 2022
- Schneider Christus der Meister (1827) Dorothea Brandt, Rena Kleifeld, Fabian Strotmann, Richard Logiewa Stojanovic, Kantorei Barmen-Gemarke, Sinfonieorchester Wuppertal, Alexander Lüken 2SACD Ars 2023
