= 1880s in Swedish music =

The following is a list of notable events of the 1880s in Swedish music.

== Births ==
- 29 August 1881: Edvin Kallstenius, Swedish composer (died 1967)
- 27 December 1881: Viktor Widqvist, Swedish military musician and composer (died 1952)
- 6 March 1885: Hildor Lundvik, musician and composer
- 16 November 1886: Helmer Alexandersson, composer and violinist
- 23 February 1887: Oskar Lindberg, composer, musician, and teacher
- 12 December 1887: Kurt Atterberg, composer

== Deaths ==
- 14 February 1880: Wilhelmina Enbom, Swedish opera singer, 75
- 7 October 1880: Fredrika Stenhammar, soprano opera singer
- 22 October 1882: Oscar Ahnfelt, Swedish composer of hymn-tunes, 69
- 29 December 1882: Josabeth Sjöberg, Swedish painter, composer and music teacher, 70
- 1884: Lovisa Charlotta Borgman, violinist
- 21 November 1885: Amalia Redec, pianist and composer
- 7 February 1887: Hanna Brooman, composer
- 15 August 1887: Hedvig Willman, opera teacher
- 2 November 1887: Jenny Lind, the "Swedish Nightingale", opera singer
- 7 February 1888: Aurore von Haxthausen, composer and pianist
- 21 March 1889: Fanny Stål, pianist
- 23 April 1889: Princess Eugénie of Sweden, componist and musician
- 24 April 1889: Mathilda Gelhaar, opera singer
- 14 July 1889: Elma Ström, opera singer
