= Södermanland Regiment (infantry) =

Coordinates: 59°23′10″N 17°00′24″E

- Södermanlands regemente
- Active: 1634–1709; 1710–1713; 1714–1942; 1957–1963
- Country: Sweden
- Allegiance: Swedish Armed Forces
- Branch: Swedish Army
- Type: Infantry
- Size: Regiment
- Part of: 4th Military District (1833–1847); 2nd Military District (1847–1867); 4th Military District (1867–1889); 5th Military District (1889–1893); 4th Army Division (1893–1901); IV Army Division (1902–1927); Eastern Army Division (1928–1936); IV Army Division (1937–1942); IV Military District (1957–1963)
- Garrison/HQ: Strängnäs
- Mottos: Regimus neque hostis ("It is we who decide - not the enemy")
- Colors: Black and yellow
- March: "Södermanlands regementes marsch" (Lundvall) (Note: The march was adopted circa 1890 and established in 1953 by Army Order 33/1953.)
- Anniversaries: 13 August (Battle of Stäket)
- Battle honours: Warsaw (1656), Frederiksodde (1658), Tåget över Bält (1658), Fraustadt (1706), Helsingborg (1710), Gadebusch (1712), Stäket (1719)

Commanders
- Notable commanders: Georg Carl von Döbeln

Insignia
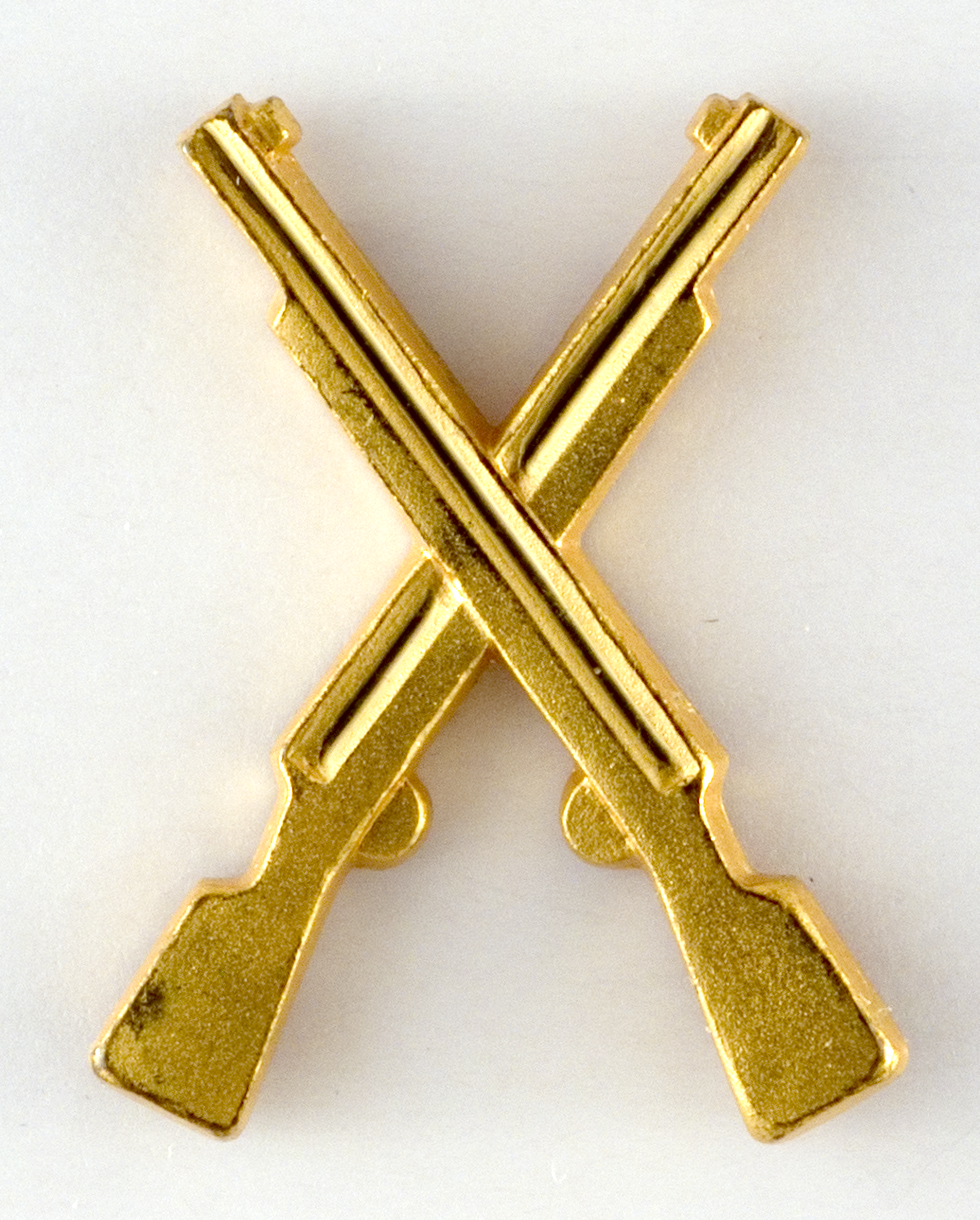
- Branch insignia m/60

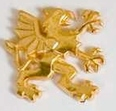
- Unit isignia m/60

Södermanland Regiment (Swedish: Södermanlands regemente), designation I 10, was a Swedish Army infantry regiment that operated 1634–1942 and 1957–1963. The unit was based in the Strängnäs Garrison in Strängnäs, Södermanland, Sweden. In 1963 the regiment was transferred to the Swedish Armoured Troops under the name of Södermanland Regiment (P 10).

== History ==
In April 1645, a detachment from the regiment led an assault on Järpsäter sconce during the Torstenson War.

In October 1939, in accordance with the Defence act of 1936, I 10 had been reorganized into a combined regiment, ie with an infantry battalion and an armored battalion. The tanks of the armored battalion came from the then disbanded Göta Life Guard (I 2) and consisted of Stridsvagn m/21-29, Stridsvagn m/31, Stridsvagn m/37 and Stridsvagn m/38, in all about 40. Due to the military-political situation of 1940, in April, for the first time in Sweden, a tank battalion was mobilized, namely the 1st Tank Battalion (1. stridsvagnsbataljonen) at I 10 in Strängnäs. Through the Defence Act of 1942, the regiment was reorganized into the Södermanland Armored Regiment (P 3) in 1942, and transferred to the newly formed Swedish Armoured Troops.

With the formation of the Armoured Troops in 1942, the organization of armored brigades was started in Sweden and on 1 July 1943, Sweden's first armored brigade, the 10th Armored Brigade (10. pansarbrigaden, PB 10) was mainly organized by the regiment. The brigade's personnel strength was 6,400 men and it was equipped with 181 tanks (mainly Stridsvagn m/41 and Stridsvagn m/42). When Uppland Regiment (I 8) was disbanded in 1957 and the command there transferred to Strängnäs (the so-called Mälarkarusellen), the regiment regained its old designation I 10. The regiment now together with Göta Life Guards (P 1) was responsible for training two armored brigades PB 6 and PB 10 and I 10 in that case for the armored infantry sections and P 1 for the tank section. PB 10 was gradually equipped during this period with Stridsvagn 74. In 1963 the regiment was returned to the armored forces under the name Södermanland Regiment (P 10).

== Units ==
In connection with the Defence Act of 1942 when the infantry regiments raised field regiments, Södermanland Regiment instead came to organize an armored brigade. The Defence Act of 1948 introduced brigades throughout the army, which resulted in the army being streamlined into two brigade types, infantry brigades and armored brigades, where Södermanland Regiment accounted for Södermanland Brigade (PB 10).

=== Södermanland Brigade ===
Södermanland Brigade (PB 10) was formed in 1949 by reorganizing the 10th Armored Brigade (10. pansarbrigaden) into an Armored Brigade Type 49 (Pansarbrigad 49). The brigade was at the same time given the name Södermanland Brigade (PB 10). By the Defence Act of 1958, the brigade was reorganized into armored infantry and was then named IB 10. In 1963, the brigade together with the regiment became part of the Swedish Armoured Troops.

=== Army Vehicle School ===
Swedish Army Vehicle School (Arméns motorskola, MotorS) was formed in 1944 as an independent functional school. The school was initially located in Stockholm. In 1948 the school was relocated to Strängnäs. On 28 May 1970, the school was separated from the Södermanland Regiment, and formed an independent unit and authority. From 1 July 1986, the school was amalgamated again into Södermanland Regiment (P 10). In the summer of 1991, the school was relocated to Skövde, where, from 1 July 1991, it was amalgamated into the newly formed Swedish Army Maintenance Center (Arméns underhållscentrum, UhC).

=== Companies ===
Companies 1-4 formed the first battalion, and companies 5-8 formed the second battalion.

1690

1. Life Company (Colonel's Company)
2. Vingåker Company (Major's Company)
3. Nyköping Company
4. Oppunda Company
5. Strängnäs Company (Lieutenant Colonel's Company)
6. Öster Rekarne Company
7. Väster Rekarne Company
8. Gripsholm Company

1850

1. Life Company
2. Vingåker Company
3. Nyköping Company
4. Oppunda Company
5. Strängnäs Company
6. Öster Rekarne Company
7. Väster Rekarne Company
8. Gripsholm Company

== Locations and training areas ==
=== Locations ===
The regiment's barracks area was built in the years 1916-1921, and the moving in took place on 3 July 1921, but was completely completed in the summer of 1923. The barracks area has been expanded over the years, for example with a new vehicle area in the late 1970s. In connection with Svea Engineer Regiment being planned to be relocated to Strängnäs, both chancellery and barracks were completed for the engineer unit.

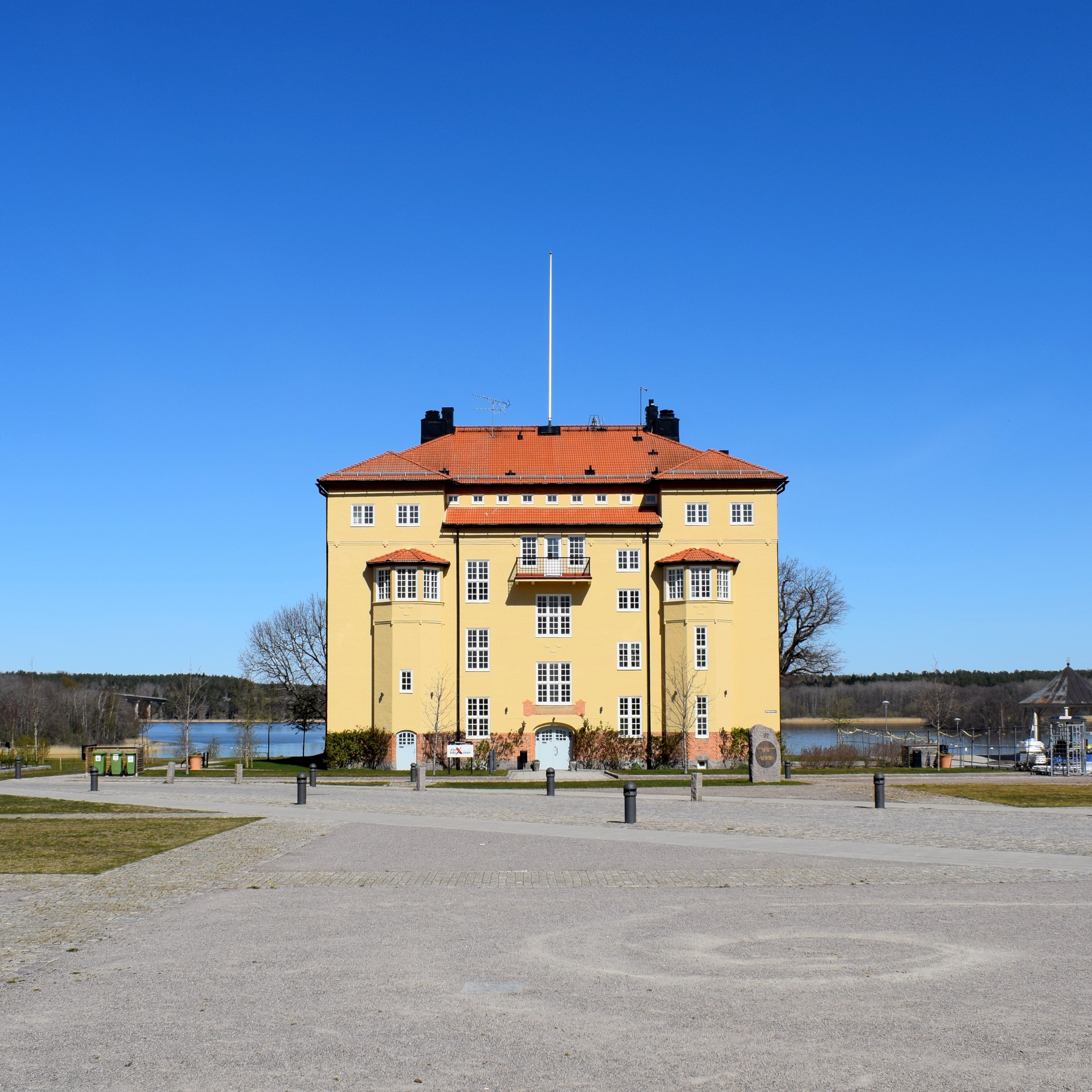
Chancery building

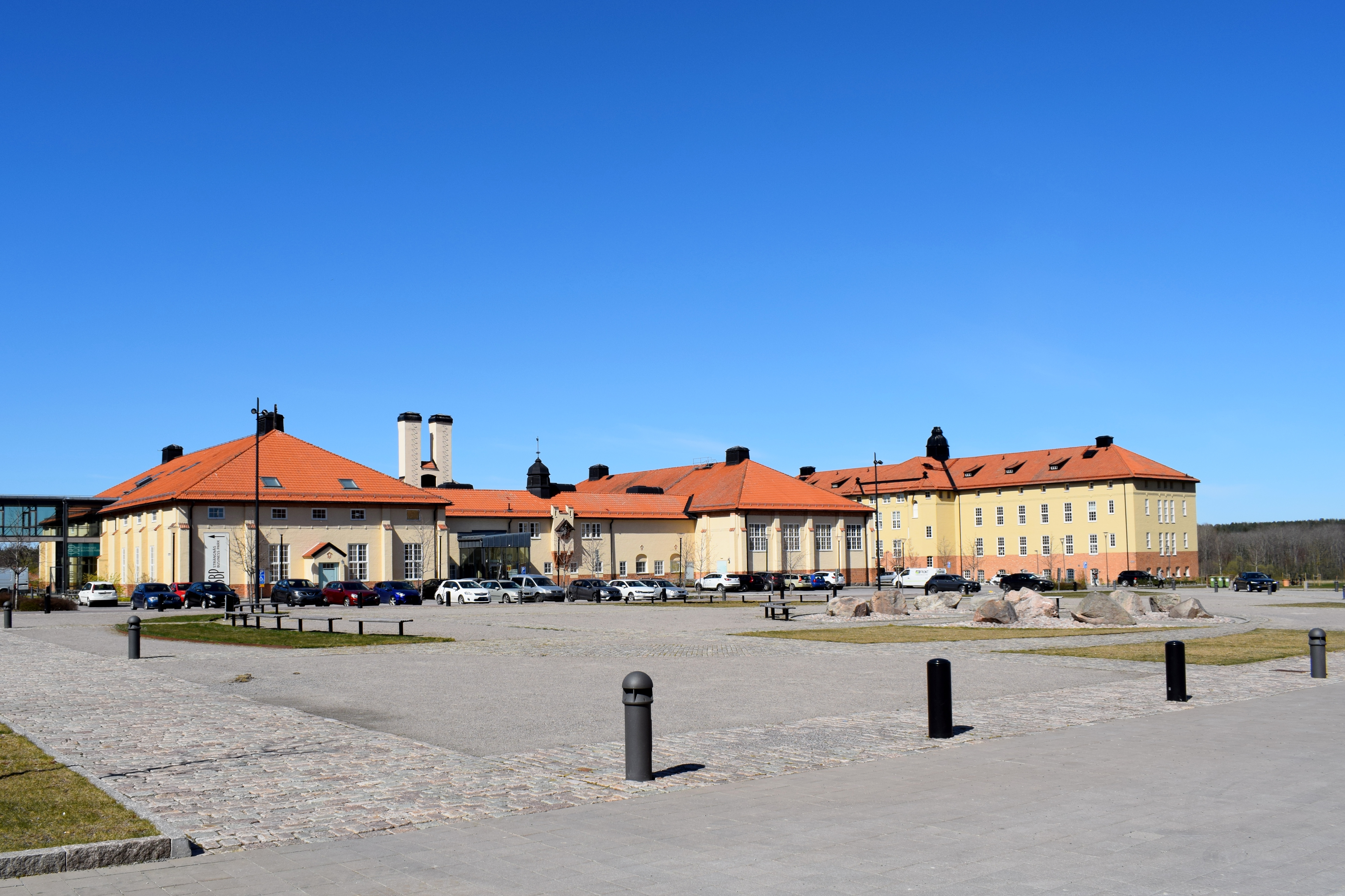
Canteen

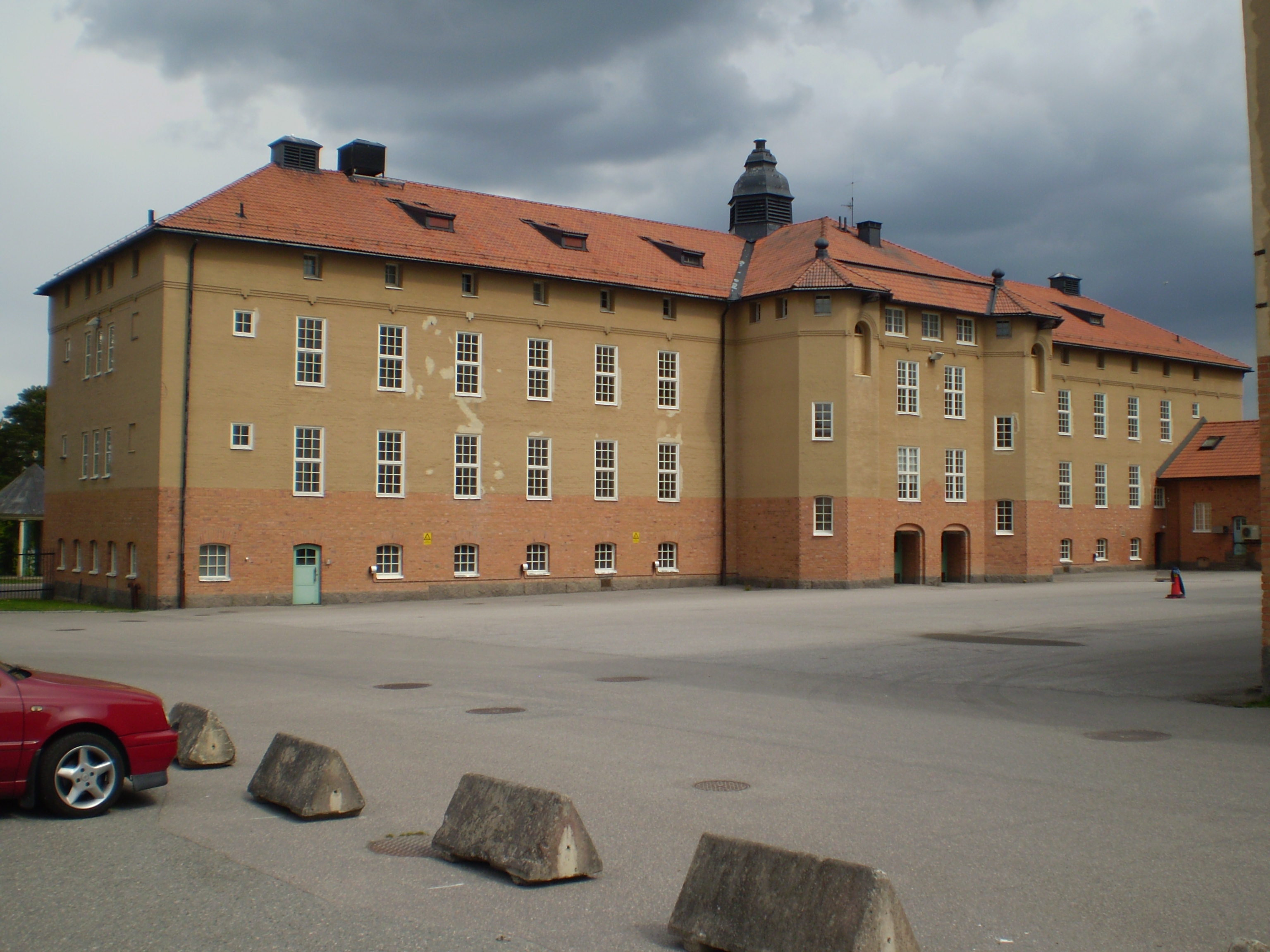
Barracks

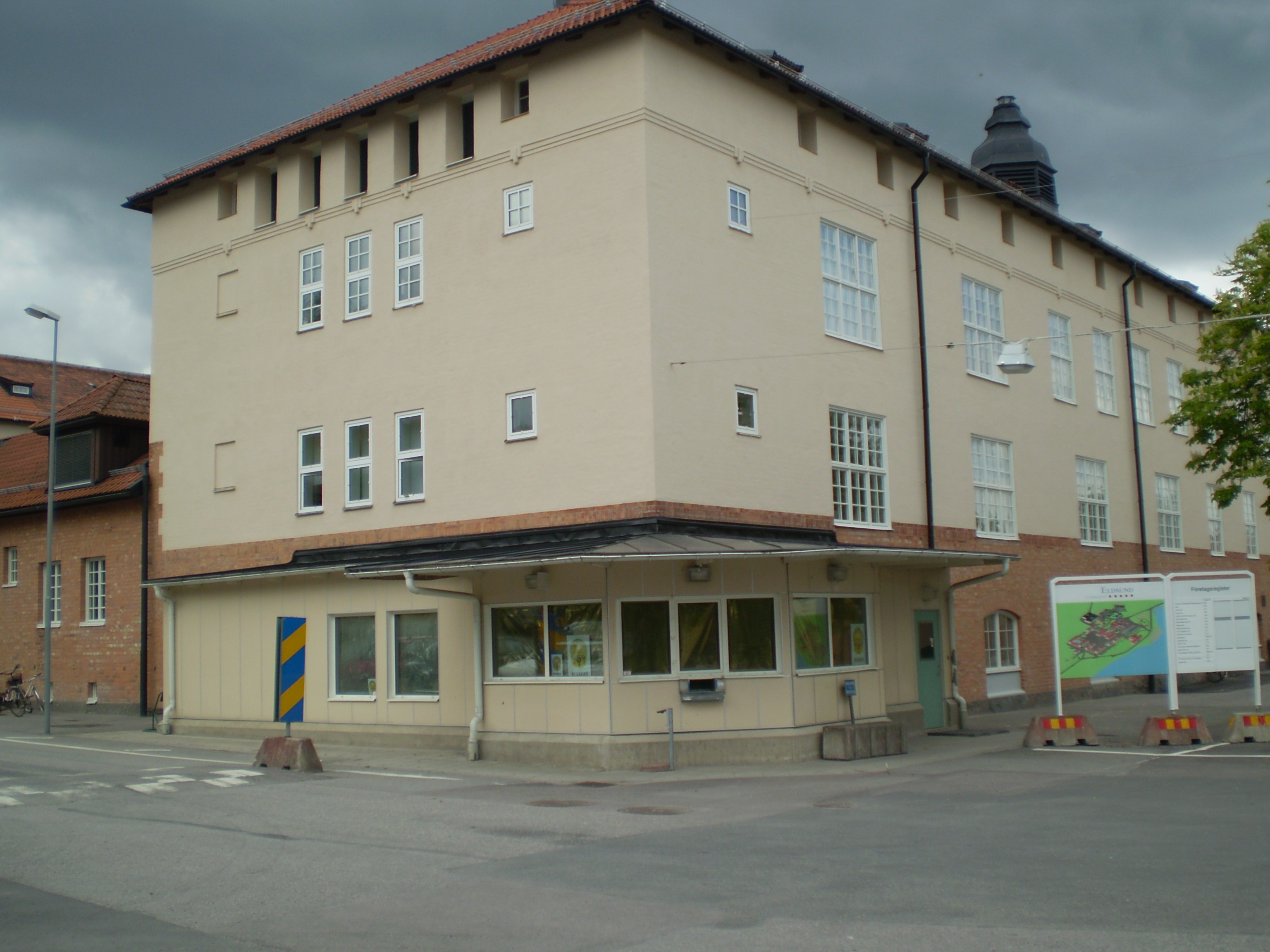
Guardhouse

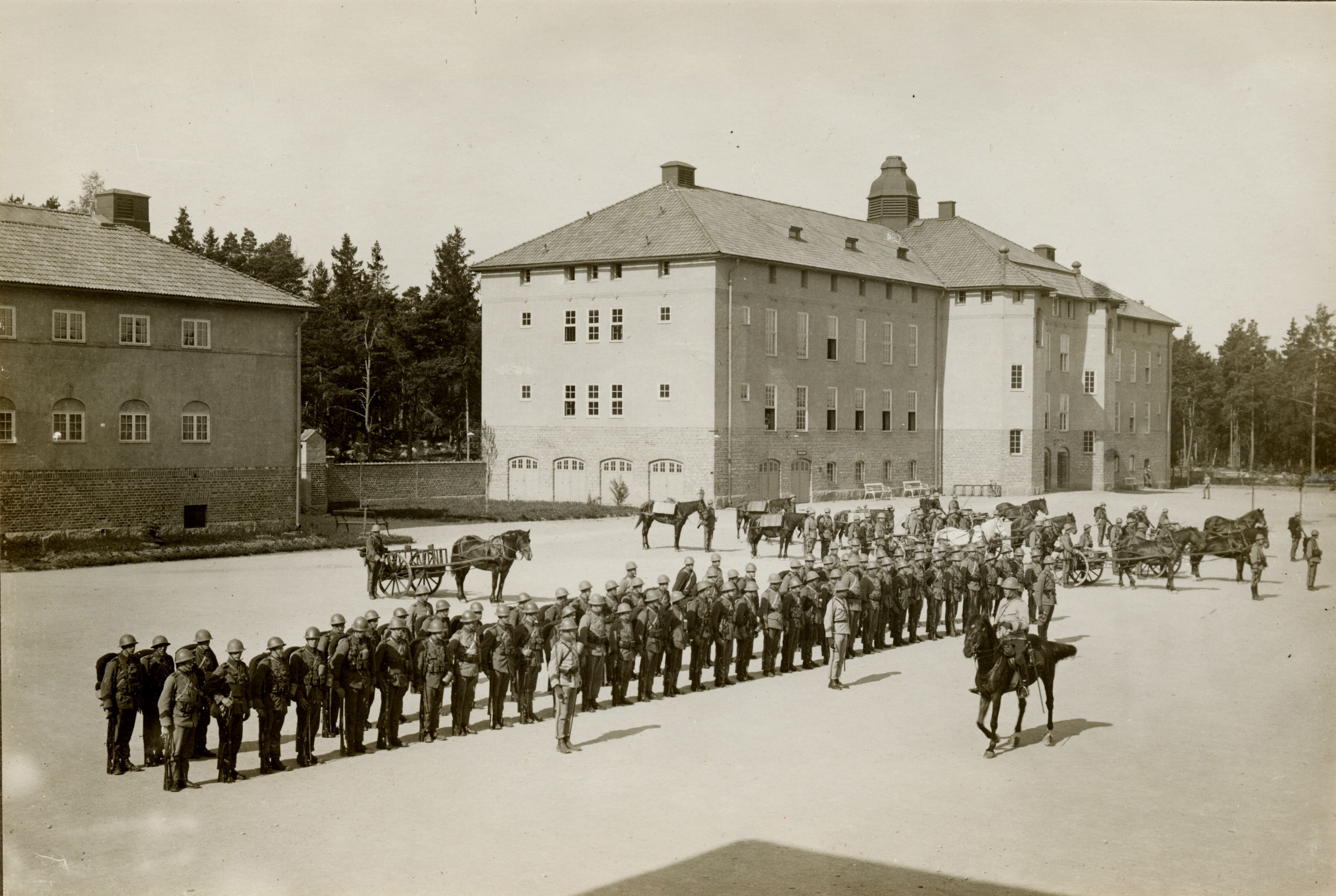
Yard in late 1920s

=== Training areas ===
The regiment trained from 1774 on Malma heath (Malma hed) at Malmköping and was moved in 1921 to barracks in Strängnäs.

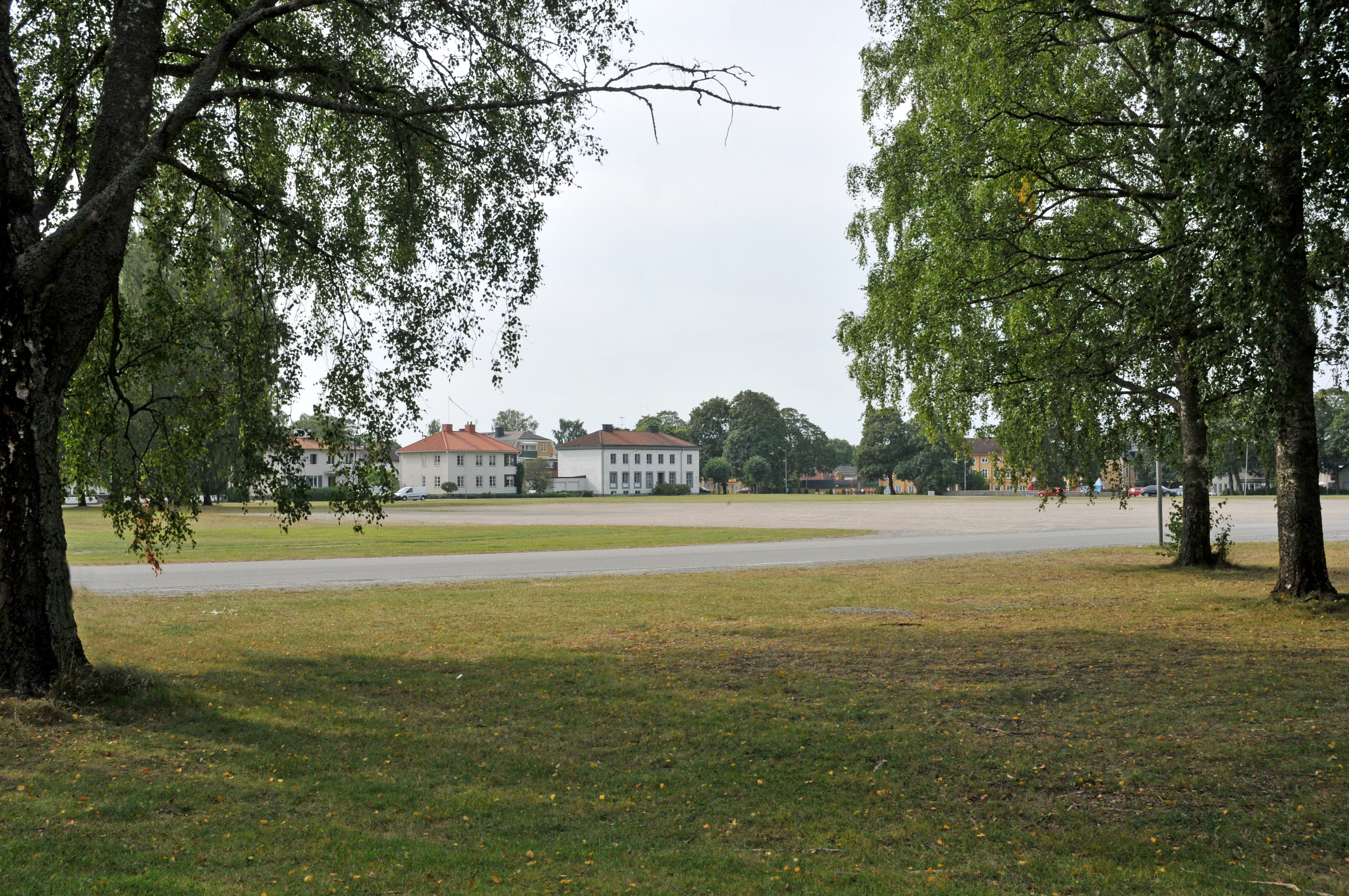
Malm Heath in Malmköping

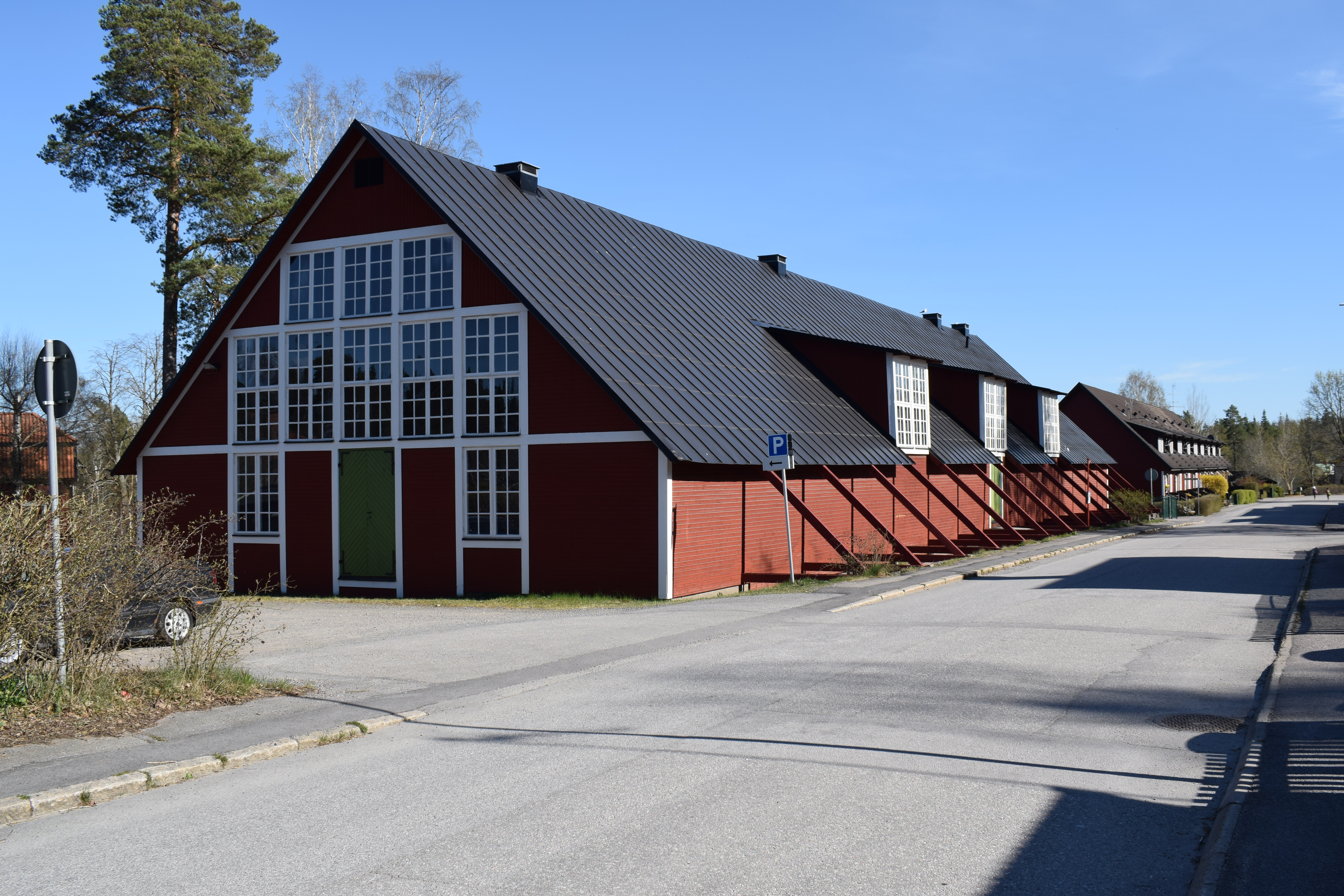
Former dormitory and gymnasium

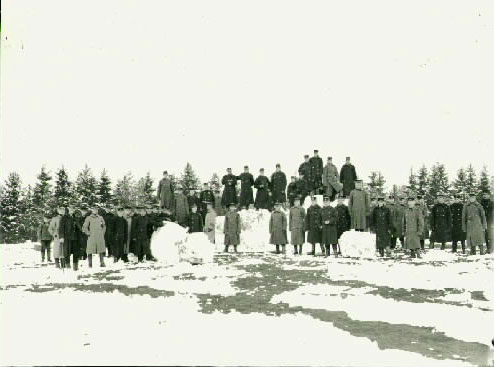
Winter exercise in 1914

== Heraldry and traditions ==
=== Coat of arms ===
Blazon: "Or, the provincial badge of Södermanland, a griffin segreant sable, armed and langued gules. The shield surmounted two swords in saltire or."

=== Colours, standards and guidons ===
The regiment presented a number of colour through the years. The regiment's last colour as infantry regiment was presented on 23 June 1850 by His Majesty the King Oscar I. The colour originally bore the battle honours Fraustadt and Södra Stäket. In 1910, the griffin was transferred to a new cloth, and in conjunction with that restoration, the colour was given additional battle honours. On 7 June 1958, His Majesty the King Gustaf VI Adolf's presented a new colour. The colour was then used until 1994 when the successor to the infantry regiment received a new colour, which was presented by His Majesty the King Carl XVI Gustaf.

== Commanding officers ==
Regimental commanders 1677–1942 and 1957–1963.

- 1627–16??: Erik Eriksson Rynning
- 1677–1683: Peter Örneklou
- 1683–1687: Evert Horn af Marienborg
- 1688–1697: Wolter Reinhold Wrangel till Ellistfer
- 1697–1708: A A Marderfelt (POW)
- 1708–1709: G von Weidenhaijn †
- 1710–1711: Jacob Grundel
- 1711–1716: C R von Schlippenbach †
- 1716–1739: Rutger Fuchs
- 1739–1750: H J von Essen
- 1750–1763: G W Marcks von Würtemberg
- 1763–1771: J Cronstedt
- 1771–1792: Gustaf Adolf von Siegroth
- 1792–1813: Gustaf Wachtmeister
- 1813–1821: Lennart Reuterskiöld
- 1821–1824: C U Ridderstolpe
- 1824–1827: C F Posse
- 1827–1837: M A Lewenhaupt
- 1837–1856: C U Kuylenstierna
- 1856–1859: P W von Schwerin
- 1859–1864: S A Sandels
- 1864–1870: Henrik Rosensvärd
- 1870–1879: C J G af Schmidt
- 1879–1881: O E F Fleming
- 1881–1887: Axel Leijonhufvud
- 1890–1896: Henning Thulstrup
- 1896–1904: S E W Brehmer
- 1904–1906: A O F von Arbin
- 1906–1910: Salomon Vilhelm Sundelius
- 1910–1921: Seth Zetterstrand
- 1921–1926: Gabriel Hedengren
- 1926–1928: Herman Låftman
- 1929–1935: Erik af Edholm
- 1935–1942: Gustaf Berggren
- 1942–1957: See Södermanland Regiment (armoured)
- 1957–1963: Fritz-Ivar Virgin

== Names, designations and locations ==
Name	Translation	From		To
Kungl. Södermanlands regemente	Royal Södermanland Regiment	1627-??-??	–	1709-07-01
Kungl. Södermanlands regemente	Royal Södermanland Regiment	1710-??-??	–	1713-05-06
Kungl. Södermanlands regemente	Royal Södermanland Regiment	1714-??-??	–	1942-09-30
Kungl. Södermanlands regemente med arméns motorskola	Royal Södermanland Regiment with the Army Vehicle School	1957-04-01	–	1963-03-31
Designation		From		To
No 10		1816-10-01	–	1914-09-30
I 10		1914-10-01	–	1942-09-30
I 10		1957-04-01	–	1963-03-31
Locations		From		To
Malma heath		1774-06-06	–	1921-06-26
Strängnäs Garrison		1921-07-03	–	1942-09-30
Strängnäs Garrison		1957-04-01	–	1963-03-31

== See also ==
- Södermanland Regiment (armoured)
- List of Swedish infantry regiments
