= Assault on Järpsäter sconce =

1645 battle of the Torstenson War

- Part of the Torstenson War
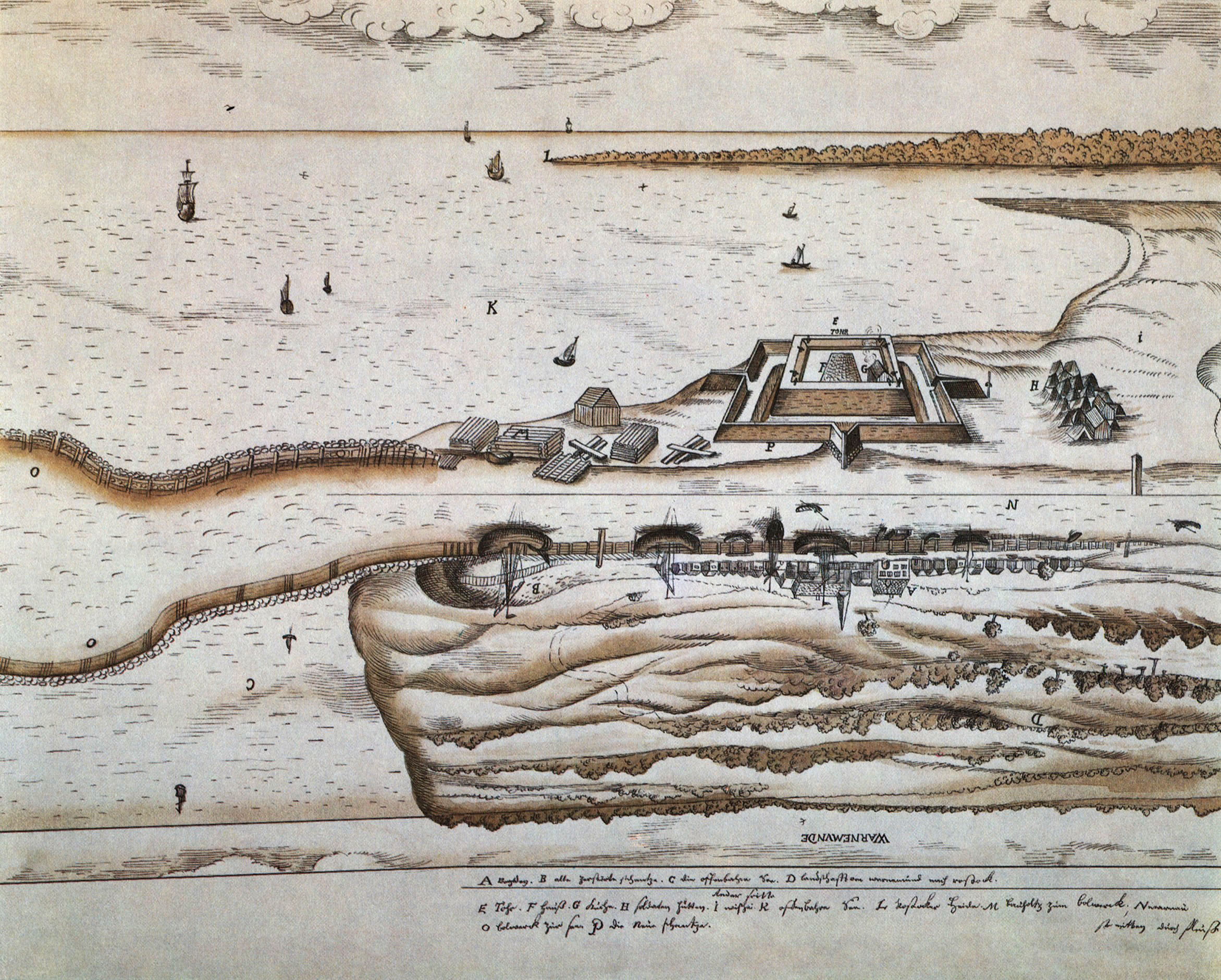
- Depiction of a sconce built at Warnemünde in 1661, drawn somewhere between 1670 and 1680
Date	April 1645
Location	Järpsäter sconce, Denmark–Norway (present-day Norway) 59.937880°N 11.994080°E
Result	Swedish victory
Territorial changes	Järpsäter sconce destroyed by Swedish forces

Belligerents
(yes) Swedish Empire	Denmark–Norway

Commanders and leaders
(yes) Unknown Quartermaster	Hans Pedersen

Units involved
Södermanland Regiment (Note: Only a detachment of the regiment led by the regiment's quartermaster was sent to capture Järpsäter sconce.)	Järpsäter sconce garrison

Strength
Unknown	24–40 men

Casualties and losses
1 killed	Most killed Several drowned

The assault on Järpsäter sconce (Note: Danish: Jerpset skanse. Article uses Swedish spelling per English source.) occurred in April 1645 during the Torstenson War between Denmark and Sweden.

Following an invasion by Hannibal Sehested into Värmland in late 1644, approximately all of Västersyssel and northern Dalsland were occupied by Norwegian troops. However, by January 1645, Generalmajor Gustaf Otto Stenbock was given command in Värmland and advanced into the province on 25 January. The Norwegians withdrew south into Dalsland, retaining Morast sconce.

Wishing to take Morast sconce, it was besieged by Welam Philip. A Swedish assault on either 10 or 12 March failed, and the sconce was instead blockaded. Aiming to also take Järpsäter sconce, a detachment from the Södermanland Regiment was sent toward it, led by the regiment's Quartermaster. After successfully making their way into the sconce, the Swedes killed most of the garrison, with some escaping into a nearby body of water, where many drowned.

== Background ==
On 13 December 1643, after months of preparation by Axel Oxenstierna, a Swedish army of 16,000 men invaded Holstein under the command of Lennart Torstensson. The invasion sparked the eponymous Torstenson War between Denmark and Sweden.

In late 1644, an army of 4,480 men and 18 cannons led by Hannibal Sehested invaded Värmland. Morast sconce was attacked by Georg Reichwein and fell on 18 November with no losses, though the Swedish garrison and its commander were taken prisoner. In response, the Swedish government began organizing for a relief expedition to Värmland.

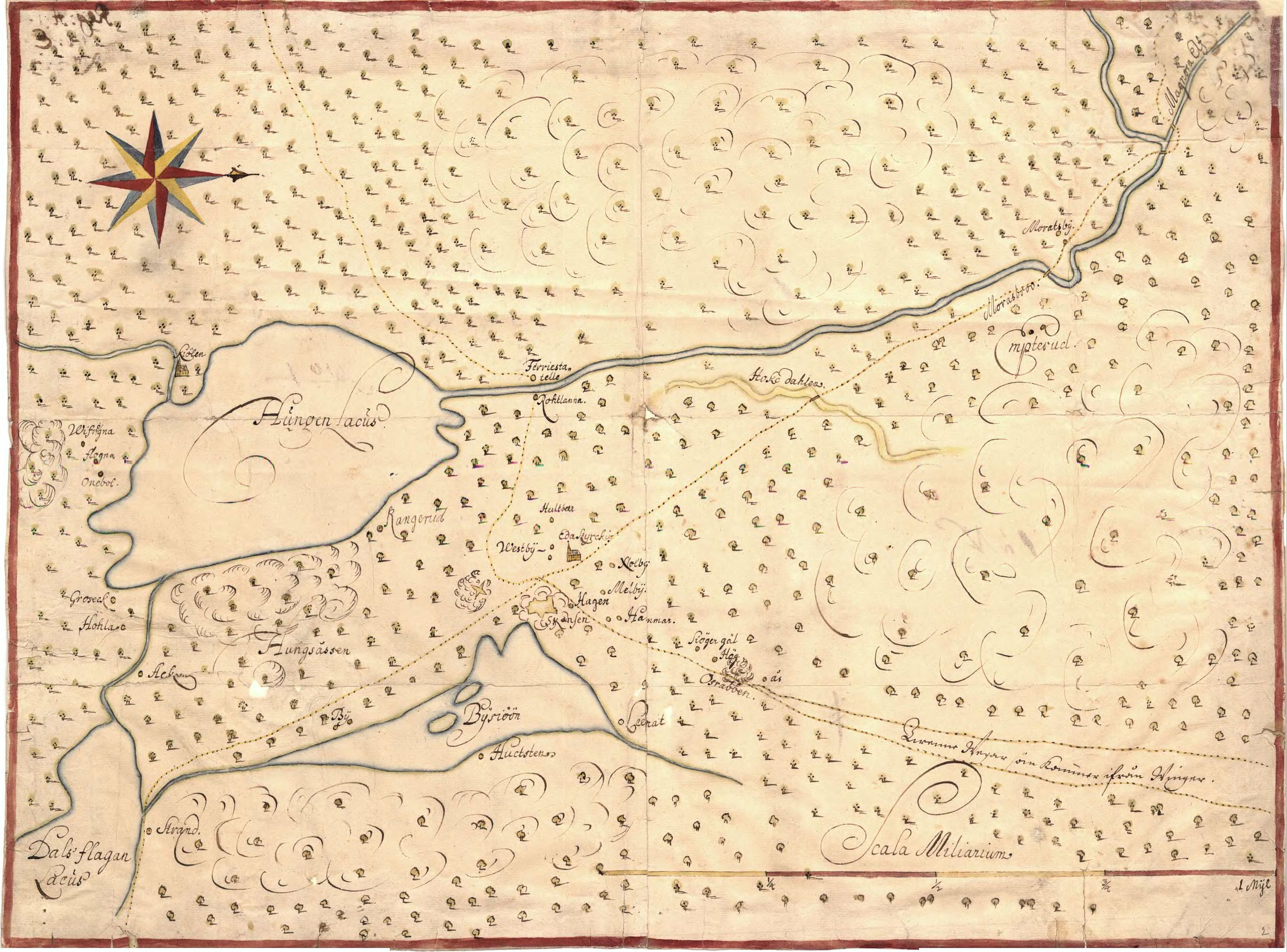
The surroundings of Eda Sconce in Värmland, mid-17th-century

On 17 December, Sehested marched to Eda Church, later marching onto the frozen Bysjön on 19 December. At this point, Sehested had some 4,000 men according to Swedish estimates. On 22 December, a battle was fought on the lake, resulting in the Swedes being defeated and fleeing in disorder.

Following the battle, Sehested's troops were distributed in Värmland, including Morast sconce, the pass toward Dalsland and Köpmannebro, the pass toward Åmål, and Eda parsonage. This resulted in northern Dalsland and approximately all of Västersyssel being occupied by Norwegian forces.

== Prelude ==
On 17 January 1645, Generalmajor Gustaf Otto Stenbock was given command in Värmland. On 25 January, he advanced through Gillberga and Kila toward Åmål. The Norwegian troops promptly withdrew south into Dalsland, though they retained Morast sconce.

In March, Morast sconce was besieged by a Swedish force led by Welam Philip. An initial assault on 10 or 12 March failed, and so the Swedes blockaded the sconce instead. Following this, a detachment from the Södermanland Regiment was sent to capture Järpsäter sconce in April.

=== Garrison size ===
The exact number of men in Järpsäter sconce's garrison is disputed. According to Norwegian historian Carl Oscar Munthe, it consisted of 24 men. Norwegian historian Johannes Henrik Schiøtz disagreed, saying it consisted of 24 soldiers and "probably around the same number" of peasants, bringing the total to some 50 men according to an account from Hans Pedersen from 18 March. Swedish historians Vilhelm Vessberg and Arnold Munthe said it numbered 40 men.

== Assault ==
Led by the regiment's quartermaster, the Swedes managed to surprise an outpost garrisoned by three men. They killed two, though the third man fled and raised the alarm. The commander of the fortress, Lieutenant Hans Pedersen, rode away toward Midskog's sconce to get help while the Swedes continued their advance.

Amid confusion from the sconce's garrison, the Swedes forced their way into the sconce with the loss of one peasant who was shot "between the shoulders". The garrison was mostly killed. Some fled across a nearby body of water where several drowned. Despite being captured, Pedersen's wife and three children were released. Fearing the arrival of reinforcements from Midskog, the Swedes blew the sconce up after taking all its supplies.

== Aftermath ==
On 24 May, Morast sconce capitulated to the Swedes on the condition of free departure for the garrison (without their weapons). Following the sconce's capitulation, the fortifications at Magnor were destroyed by the Norwegians to deny them of any use to the Swedes. With the Norwegians withdrawing from Värmland, the so-called Hannibalsfejden ended.
