= Wilhelm Altmann =

German historian and musicologist

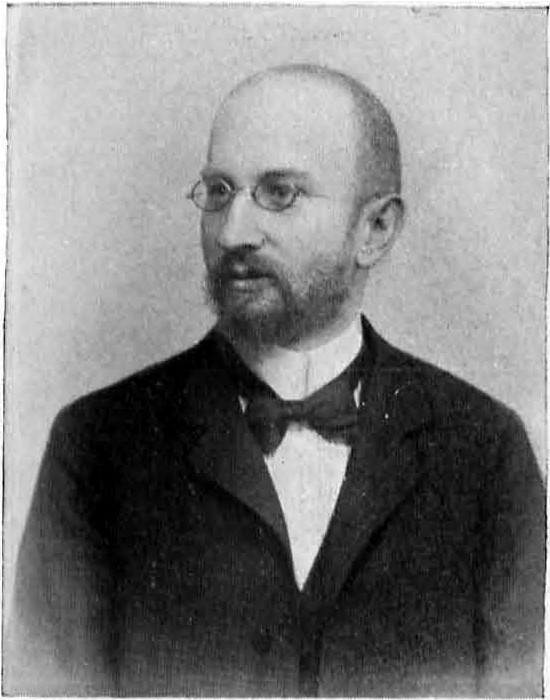
- Born: 4 April 1862; Adelnau, Poznań
- Died: 25 March 1951 (aged 88); Hildesheim
- Occupations: German historian; Musicologist

Wilhelm Altmann (4 April 1862 – 25 March 1951) was a German historian and musicologist.

== Biography ==
Wilhelm Altmann was born on 4 April 1862 in Adelnau, Poznań. He attended school in Breslau where he studied under Otto Küstner in music theory and the violin. From 1882-1885, he studied medieval history and classical philology at Marburg and Berlin. He then attended the Royal University, where he trained to be a librarian. In 1889, he moved to Greifswald, Germany, where he worked at Greifswald University as a librarian, and lectured in medieval history. In 1900, he got a job at the Royal Library in Berlin, and was the founder of Deutsche Musik Sammlung. In 1915, he became director of the music section at Musik Sammlung, where he remained until he retired in 1927. Altmann died on 25 March 1951 in Hildesheim. He was married to Marie née Louis, and they had three children.

== Literary works ==
- The election of Albrecht II as Roman king. Dissertation (1885).
- The Roman expedition of Ludwig of Bavaria (1886).
- Acta Nicolai Gramis (1889).
- Eberhard Windecke's Memoirs on the History of the Age of Emperor Sigmund. R. Gaertners Verlagsbuchhandlung, Berlin (1893).
- The old Frankfurt German translation of the Golden Bull of Emperor Charles IV (1897).
- Böhmer, JF, Regesta Imperii XI: The Documents of Emperor Sigmund 1410-1437, ed. by Altmann, Wilhelm, Innsbruck (1896–1900).
- Public music libraries - A pious wish, Journal of the International Music Society, H. 1, pp. 1–17. (1903).
- Richard Wagner's letters by chronology and content (1905).
- German Music Collection at the Königl. Library in Berlin, in: Zentralblatt für Bibliothekswesen, vol. 23, H. 2, p. 66 ff. (1906).
- Selected documents on non-German constitutional history since 1776, 2nd increased edition (1913).
- Selected documents on the Brandenburg-Prussian constitutional and administrative history, 1st part 15th-18th Century, 2nd edition (1914).
- Selected documents on the Brandenburg-Prussian constitutional and administrative history, 2nd part 1806-1849, 2nd edition (1915).
- The chamber music works of Friedrich Lux. (1920).
- Tonkünstlerlexikon, (1926).
- String Quartet Player's Handbook, Vol. 1: String Quartets (1927).
- String Quartet Player's Handbook, Vol. 2: String Quartets (1927).
- Handbook for String Quartet Players, Vol. 3: String Trios, Quintets, Sextets, Octets (1929).
- Introduction to Schubert's so-called Trout Quintet. Op. 114 (Electrola Musikplatten EJ 334-357). (1929).
- Handbook for String Quartet Players, Vol. 4: Music for Strings and Winds (1930).
- Kammermusik literature, ^{5}1931
- Handbook for Piano Trio Players (1934).
- Handbook for Piano Quintet Players (1936).
- Piano Quartet Player's Handbook (1937).
- Otto Nicolai's Diaries (1937).
