= The Duchess of Athens =

Opera by Friedrich Lux

The Duchess of Athens (German: Die Fürstin von Athen) is a German comic opera with music by Friedrich Lux and the libretto by writer Wilhelm Jacoby. Jacoby, who was well known for his farces, based the work on a play by the Greek writer Aristophanes. The work was first published in 1884, and received its première in Mainz in 1896.

== Bibliography ==
- Grange, William. Historical Dictionary of German Theater. Scarecrow Press, 2006.
- Parsons, Charles H. The Mellen Opera Reference Index: Opera librettists and their works A–L. Edwin Mellen Press, 1987.
