= Hanna Brooman =

Swedish composer, translator and educator

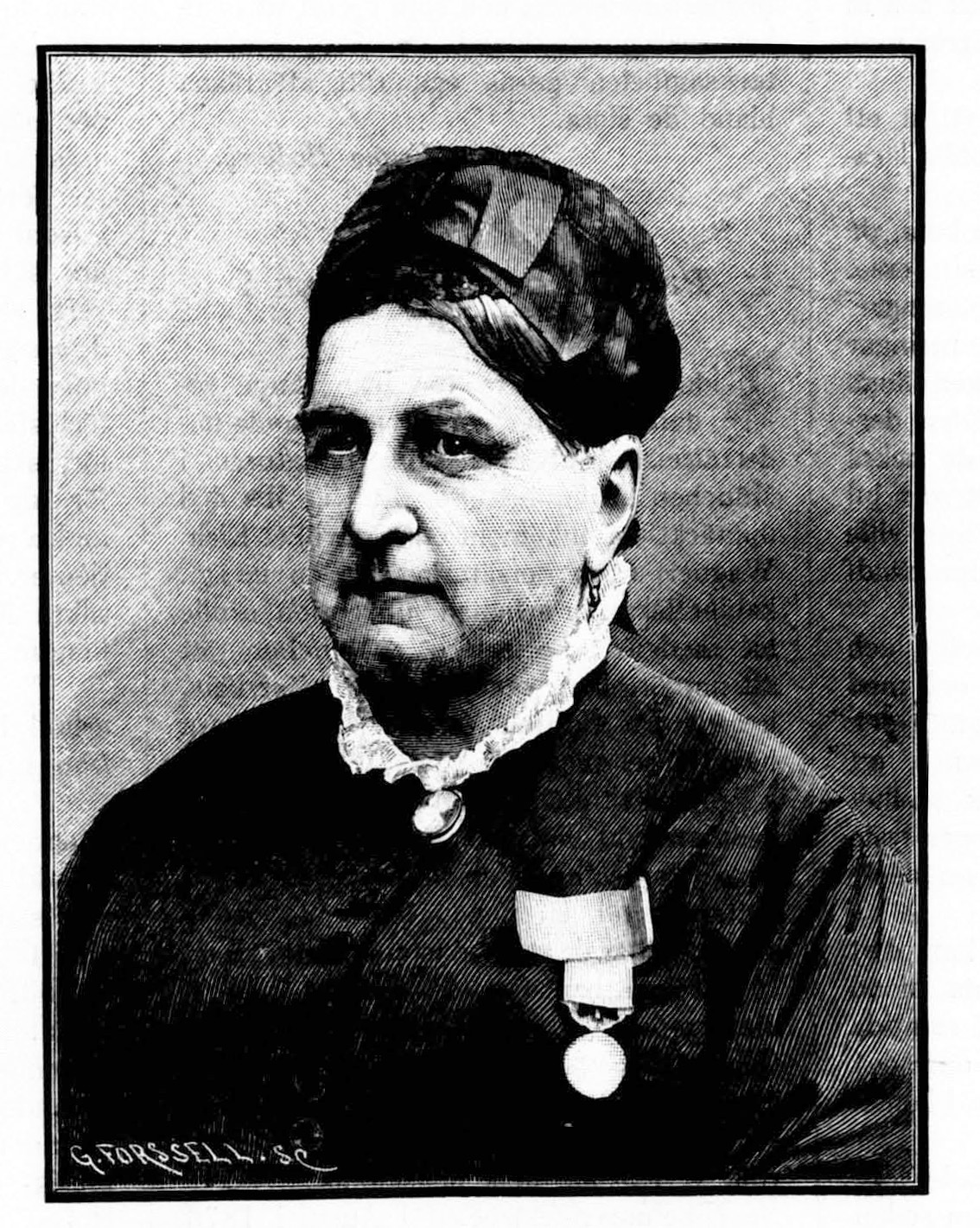
A portrait of Hanna Brooman

Johanna Amalia "Hanna" Brooman (Swedish pronunciation: [jʊˈhânːa ˈhânːa aˈmɑ̌ːlia ˈbrǔːmanː]; 21 August 1809 – 7 February 1887), was a Swedish composer, translator and educator. She was active as a teacher of the Royal Dramatic Training Academy from 1847 until 1884 (except for the years 1851–1856).

== Life ==
Hanna Brooman was born in Stockholm and was the foster child of the opera singer Johan Erik Brooman. She never married. As an adult, she was active as a music and language teacher in Stockholm for many years, and remained there until her death.

From 1847, Brooman was engaged as a teacher in the school of the actors- and ballet students at the royal theater and opera in Stockholm, the Royal Dramatic Training Academy. Except for the period of 1851–1856, she kept this post until her retirement in 1884. The students of the Royal Dramatic Theatre, Royal Swedish Opera and Royal Swedish Ballet during this period started as children, and though they were instructed in their future profession by experts, they were also given instruction in elementary subjects. This part of their education had previously been provided by the head of the Royal Dramatic Training Academy, and the students had been housed as boarding school students in the home of Christina Fundin (mother of Wilhelmina Fundin), but the boarding school of Fundin was closed in 1846, and Brooman was employed to provide the elementary education schooling to the students.

Hanna Brooman provided instruction in Christianity, Writing, piano forte, French, German, Italian, history and geography for both male and female students, as well as sewing and needlework for the girls.

Erik af Edholm described her as "a good teacher and person" (1869), and Frans Hedberg described her in his necrology:

"She taught with the heart as much as with her reason; with an unusually rich, patient, never undying love, as far away from all indulgence as well as from all bad tempered mastering, as warm for the greater gifts as well as for the small, yes, often more tenderly for the spiritually poor than for those, which whom the conscientious teacher could have glowed, if it had been her nature."

Hanna Brooman was also active as a composer and translator. She translated and rewrote foreign plays for several theatres in Stockholm. She also composed piano music. Her compositions have been described as: "weak, melodic bits of atmosphere, good representatives of the Swedish Romantic lieden of the 1830s- and 40s."

She was awarded the H. M. The King's Medal.

== Works ==
- Norrlänningens hemlängtan (The Homesickness of the Northerners), piano song (1839)
- Tre sånger (Three Songs), piano song, (1844)
- Herr och fru Tapperman (Mr. and Mrs. Tapperman), play; translation and rework of a comedy play, Madame et Monsieur Pinchon, by Jean-François Bayard, Dumanoir and Dennery (1848)
