= Friedrich Lux =

German conductor and composer (1820–1895)

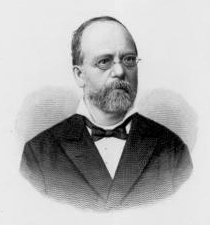
Friedrich Lux

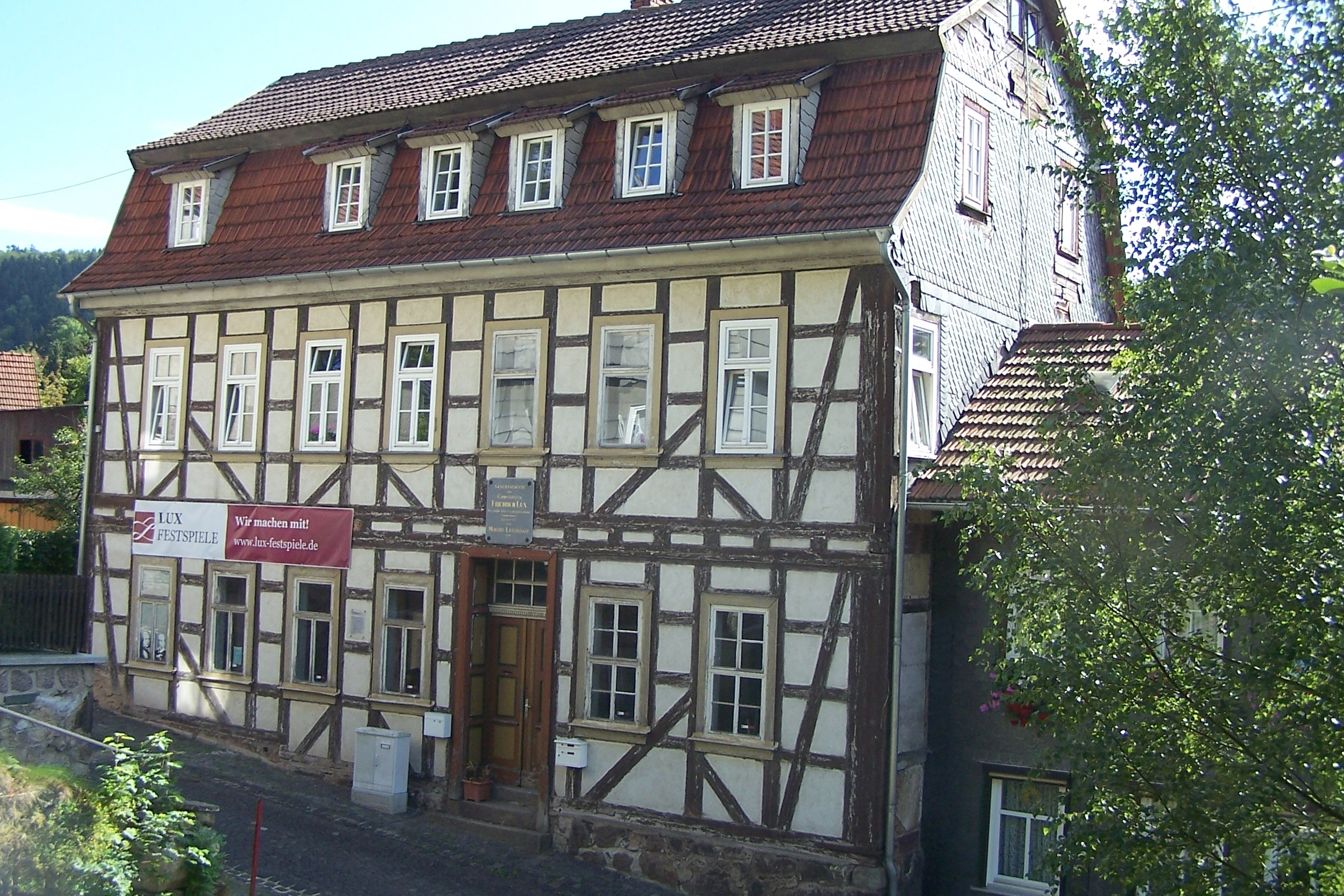
Friedrich Lux’s birthplace in Ruhla

Friedrich Lux (24 November 1820 – 9 July 1895) was a German conductor, composer and organist.

He was born in the town of Ruhla, son of composer Georg Heinrich Lux. His father gave him his first music lessons, and Lux later became a student of Friedrich Schneider.

Between 1841 and 1850, he was Director of the Opera in Dessau and from 1851 to 1857 performed the same role in Mainz for the Mainz Singing Academy.

== Notable works ==
In 1882, he composed the opera Der Schmied von Ruhla (The Smith of Ruhla), with a libretto by Ludwig C. Bauer.

In 1884, he composed the comic opera Die Fürstin von Athen (The Duchess of Athens), with a libretto by Wilhelm Jacoby.

In addition, Friedrich Lux wrote a missa brevis, festival overtures, numerous organ pieces, three string quartets and a piano trio as well as numerous choral works for different voices. There has been renewed interest in Lux's works since his death. The Lux Festival Association has been organizing concert series in its hometown of Ruhla and the Wartburg region in Thuringia since 2011 and the Lux Festival since 2013.

=== Opus works ===
- Opus 21 – Coronation March for Orchestra (1861)
- Opus 29 - Concert Fantasy on O sanctissima for organ
- Opus 32 - Romance from the opera Casilda by Ernest II, Duke of Saxe-Coburg and Gotha for organ
- Opus 33 - Concert piece on the prayer from Weber's Der Freischütz for organ
- Opus 52 – Concert Variations on a Theme ("The Harmonious Blacksmith") by Handel for organ
- Opus 53 - Concert Fantasy on Martin Luther's chorale Ein' Feste Burg ("A Mighty Fortress Is Our God") for organ
- Opus 55 - Great Religious March for the opening of church celebrations for organ
- Opus 56 - Concert Fugue for Organ
- Opus 57 – Canon for organ
- Opus 58 – Quartet for 2 violins, viola and cello (D minor)
- Opus 59 - Hymn: Sounds, celebratory song for soprano solo, male choir and organ
- Opus 60 – Andante on the chorale melody How beautiful the morning star shines for us for organ and violoncello or horn
- Opus 61 - Concert piece for organ, 2 horns and 3 trombones
- Opus 63 – Sacred Song without Words for Organ
- Opus 64 – Fantasy pastorale (concert piece) for organ
- Opus 72 - Missa brevis et solemnis, for soloists and choir with accompaniment of orchestra and organ (harmonium)
- Opus 72a - Benedictus from Missa brevis et solemnis for soprano solo and eight-part female choir with accompaniment of organ or harmonium
- Opus 75 – Fantasy on Mozart's ordination song Brothers, give your hand to the league

=== Organ Arrangements ===
- Adagio by Louis Spohr
- Concerto in D major by Handel
- Three pieces from Handel's Messiah in the form of a sonata
- Variations from Joseph Haydn's Emperor Quartet
- March from the 1st suite opus 113 by Franz Lachner
- Introduction to Act 3 of Richard Wagner's Die Meistersinger von Nürnberg
- Meditation on Johann Sebastian Bach's 1st Prelude by Charles Gounod for organ alone
- Seventy selected organ pieces by Christian Heinrich Rinck arranged for organ without pedal (harmonium) and provided with fingering

== Literature ==
- August Reissmann: Friedrich Lux. His life and works. Breitkopf & Härtel, Leipzig (1888)
- Wilhelm Altmann: The Chamber Music Works by Friedrich Lux. Diemer, Mainz (1920)
- Alfred Einstein: Hugo Riemann's music dictionary. 11th edition. Tape 1: A - L. Max Hesse's publishing house, Berlin (1929)
- Christoph-Hellmut Mahling: A Musicological Anthology. Hellmut Federhofer on his 75th birthday (Mainz Studies on Musicology. Volume 21). H. Schneider, Tutzing (1988)
- Günter Wagner: Friedrich Lux (1820–1895). A forgotten Thuringian-Rhenish musician.

== Bibliography ==
- Short, Michael. Liszt Letters in the Library of Congress. Pendragon Press, 2003.
