= Francisco de Sá Noronha =

Portuguese composer and violinist

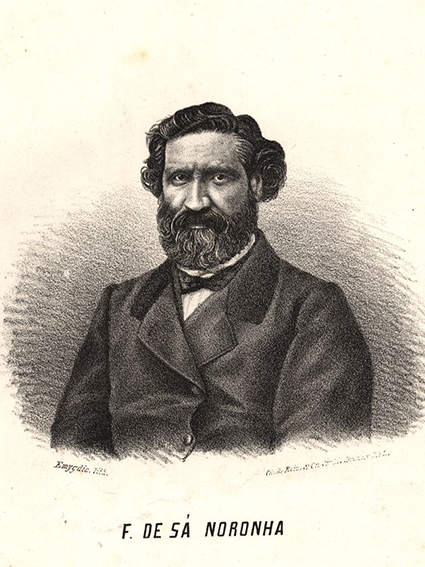
Francisco de Sá Noronha.png

Francisco de Sá Noronha (Viana do Castelo, 1820 – 1881) was a Portuguese composer and violinist who wrote a "Fantasy for violin and orchestra", and many other works.
