= Erik af Edholm =

Swedish Army officer

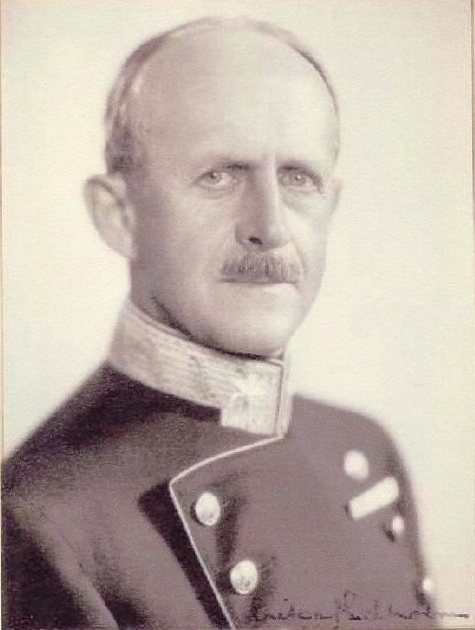
- af Edholm in 1936.
- Born: Erik Gustaf af Edholm; 6 November 1878; Stockholm, Sweden
- Died: 16 February 1954 (aged 75); Stockholm, Sweden
- Military career
- Allegiance: Sweden
- Branch: Swedish Army
- Service years: 1899–1942
- Rank: Lieutenant General
- Commands: Södermanland Regiment; Eastern Brigade; III Army Division
- Conflicts: Balkan Wars

Lieutenant General Erik Gustaf af Edholm (6 November 1878 – 16 February 1954) was a Swedish Army officer. His senior commands include commanding officer of the Södermanland Regiment, the Eastern Brigade and the III Army Division. af Edholm began his military career in 1899 as a second lieutenant with the Svea Life Guards and later studied at the Royal Swedish Army Staff College, where he also taught tactics from 1912 to 1917. He held various roles in the General Staff, rising through the ranks and gaining experience as a military attaché during the Balkan Wars and through studies with the Italian Army. In 1919, he became secretary of the Committee Against Opposition to National Defence Propaganda.

Over the 1920s and 1930s, he held key positions, including chief of staff of the IV Army Division, battalion commander in the Svea Life Guards, and leader of chemical safety courses. Promoted to colonel, he commanded the Södermanland Regiment from 1929 to 1935 and undertook military studies in Italy and duties in the Saar Territory. In 1936, he was promoted to major general and later served as commander of the III Army Division until his retirement in 1944, when he was placed in the reserve as a lieutenant general.

== Early life ==
af Edholm was born on 6 November 1878 in Stockholm, Sweden, the son of the First Marshal of the Court Erik af Edholm (1817–1897) and his wife Emma Mariana Charlotta Braunerhielm (1847–1920). His uncle was the physician Edvard Edholm (1831–1913), and his grandfather was the physician Erik af Edholm (1777–1856).

af Edholm passed mogenhetsexamen (upper secondary school leaving examination) in Stockholm on 21 May 1897. He became a volunteer with the Svea Life Guards on 1 June the same year and was promoted to sergeant on 15 August 1898. He entered the Royal Military Academy on 26 September that same year and was appointed fanjunkare (warrant officer) with the Svea Life Guards on 12 August 1899. He completed his officer’s examination on 25 November 1899.

== Career ==
af Edholm was commissioned as an underlöjtnant (second lieutenant) and assigned to the Svea Life Guards on 8 December 1899. He became a student at the Royal Swedish Army Staff College in 1902 and was promoted to lieutenant in the same regiment on 24 April 1903. He completed the course at the Royal Swedish Army Staff College on 27 June 1904. He was appointed staff adjutant and lieutenant with the General Staff on 6 November 1908, and promoted to captain in the same staff on 25 June 1912. From 1912 to 1917, af Edholm served as a lecturer in tactics at the Royal Swedish Army Staff College.

During the Balkan Wars (1912–1913), he was military attaché to the Hellenic Army and the Montenegrin Army, and in 1913, he conducted military studies with the Italian Army in Tripoli. He was appointed captain in the Svea Life Guards on 29 May 1913 and again served as captain in the same regiment on 22 December 1916.

af Edholm became secretary in the Committee Against Opposition to National Defence Propaganda (Kommittén mot försvarsfientlig propaganda) in 1919. He returned to the General Staff as staff adjutant and captain on 16 January 1920, and was promoted to senior adjutant and major on the same day. He served as chief of staff of the IV Army Division (IV. arméfördelningen) from 1920 to 1923 and became a major in the Svea Life Guards on 16 February 1923 where he served as battalion commander. He was head and leader in chemical agent safety courses from 1925 to 1928 and in 1933.

af Edholm was promoted to lieutenant colonel in the army on 15 January 1926 and assigned as lieutenant colonel to the Västerbotten Regiment on 27 January 1926. He was then promoted to colonel in the army and was appointed acting regimental commander of Södermanland Regiment in 1928. He was appointed regimental commander of Södermanland Regiment in 1929 and stayed in this position until 1935. He conducted military studies in Italy in 1931 and was commanded to the Saar Territory in 1934. af Edholm became commander of the Eastern Brigade in 1935 and was promoted to major general in 1936. He was commander of the III Army Division from 1937 to 1942 before retiring and placed in the reserve as lieutenant general in 1944.

== Personal life ==
af Edholm married Tyra Amanda Steinwall on 8 May 1918, at Gustaf Adolf Church in Stockholm. She was born on 28 March 1898, in Stockholm and was the daughter of accountant Johan Lennart Steinwall and Agnes Josefina Bergstrand.

They had three children: Marianne Agnes Elisabet (26 February 1919 – 2012), Margareta Emma Tyra (29 January 1921 – 2006), and Erik Eriksson (21 April 1923 – 2009).

== Death ==
af Edholm died in 1954 and was buried in Solna cemetery.

== Dates of rank ==
- 15 August 1898 – Sergeant
- 12 August 1899 – Fanjunkare
- 8 December 1899 – Underlöjtnant
- 24 April 1903 – Lieutenant
- 25 June 1912 – Captain
- 16 January 1920 – Major
- 15 January 1926 – Lieutenant colonel
- 1928 – Colonel
- 1936 – Major general
- 1944 – Lieutenant general

== Awards and decorations ==
=== Swedish ===
- (Sweden) Commander Grand Cross of the Order of the Sword (15 November 1943)
- (Sweden) Knight of the Order of the Sword (5 June 1920)

=== Foreign ===
- Commander 1st Class of the Order of the White Rose of Finland
- (Latvia) Grand Officer of the Order of the Three Stars
- (Lithuania) Grand Officer of the Order of the Lithuanian Grand Duke Gediminas
- (Poland) Commander 1st Class of the Order of Polonia Restituta
- Commander of the Order of the Crown of Italy
- (Norway) Commander of the Order of St. Olav
- (Kingdom of Montenegro) Officer of the Order of Prince Danilo I (25 May 1914)
- (Netherlands) Officer of the Order of Orange-Nassau with swords (9 January 1914)
- (Tunisia) Officer of the Order of Glory (13 December 1913)
- (Greece) Greek campaign medal (2 September 1914)

== Honours ==
- Member of the Royal Swedish Academy of War Sciences

== Bibliography ==
- Edholm, Erik af; Dahlgren, Curt (1926). Stridsgaser och rök i lantkriget [Chemical agents and smoke in ground war]. Skrifter / Militärlitteraturföreningens förlag, 99-0578882-4; 146 (in Swedish). Stockholm: [Norstedt exp.] SELIBR 1340168.

Military offices
| Preceded by Lennart Lilliehöök | III Army Division; 1937–1942 | Succeeded by None |
