= List of years in Icelandic music =

This page indexes the individual year in Icelandic music pages. Each year is annotated with a significant event as a reference point.

2010s - Pre-2010s

== 2010s ==
- 2017 in Icelandic music, death of Jórunn Viðar.
- 2016 in Icelandic music
- 2015 in Icelandic music
- 2014 in Icelandic music
- 2013 in Icelandic music
- 2012 in Icelandic music
- 2011 in Icelandic music
- 2010 in Icelandic music

== Pre-2010s ==
- 2009 in Icelandic music
