= Franjo Krežma =

Croatian violinist and composer (1862–1881)

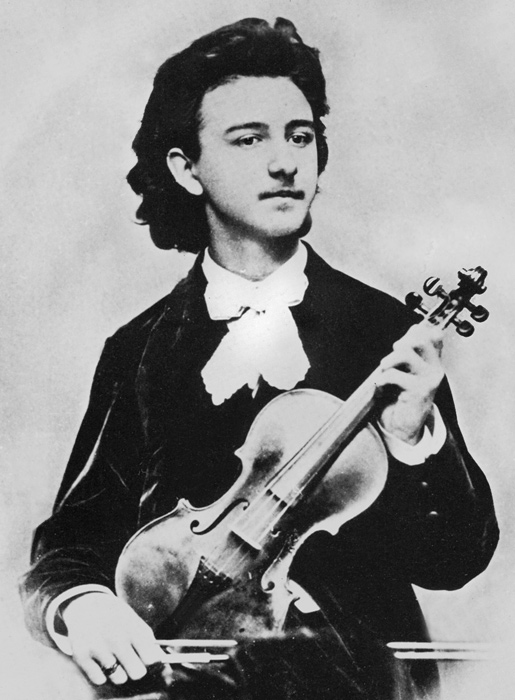
Franjo Krežma

Franjo Krežma (4 September 1862 – 15 June 1881), also known as Franz Krezma in German-speaking countries, was a Croatian violinist and composer.

== Family and education ==
Born in Osijek, Austrian Empire, he showed interest for music in his early childhood and began playing the violin, gaining a reputation as a violinist. After moving to Zagreb he was taught by the violinist, composer and conductor Đuro (Gjuro) Eisenhuth. Krežma performed his first public concert on the 10.8.1870 in Sisak, at the very young age of 8, playing his violin with his three years older sister Anka (later Krežma-Barbot) backing him on the piano. Noticed and recommended by the Zagreb-born composer Leopold Alexander Zellner, he entered the music Conservatory of Vienna, Austria-Hungary at the age of 9, as the youngest student ever, already then starting to compose, and completing studies before the age of 13, in the summer of 1875.

== Career ==
Having finished his studies, Krežma started a European career, performing with his sister. By the age of 16, he had performed in cities across Europe like Rome, Prague, Genoa, Paris and Venice. On 1 July 1879, at the age of 16, he became the concert master at Benjamin Bilse's Bilse'sche Kapelle, the orchestra which would in the following years become Berlin Philharmonic.

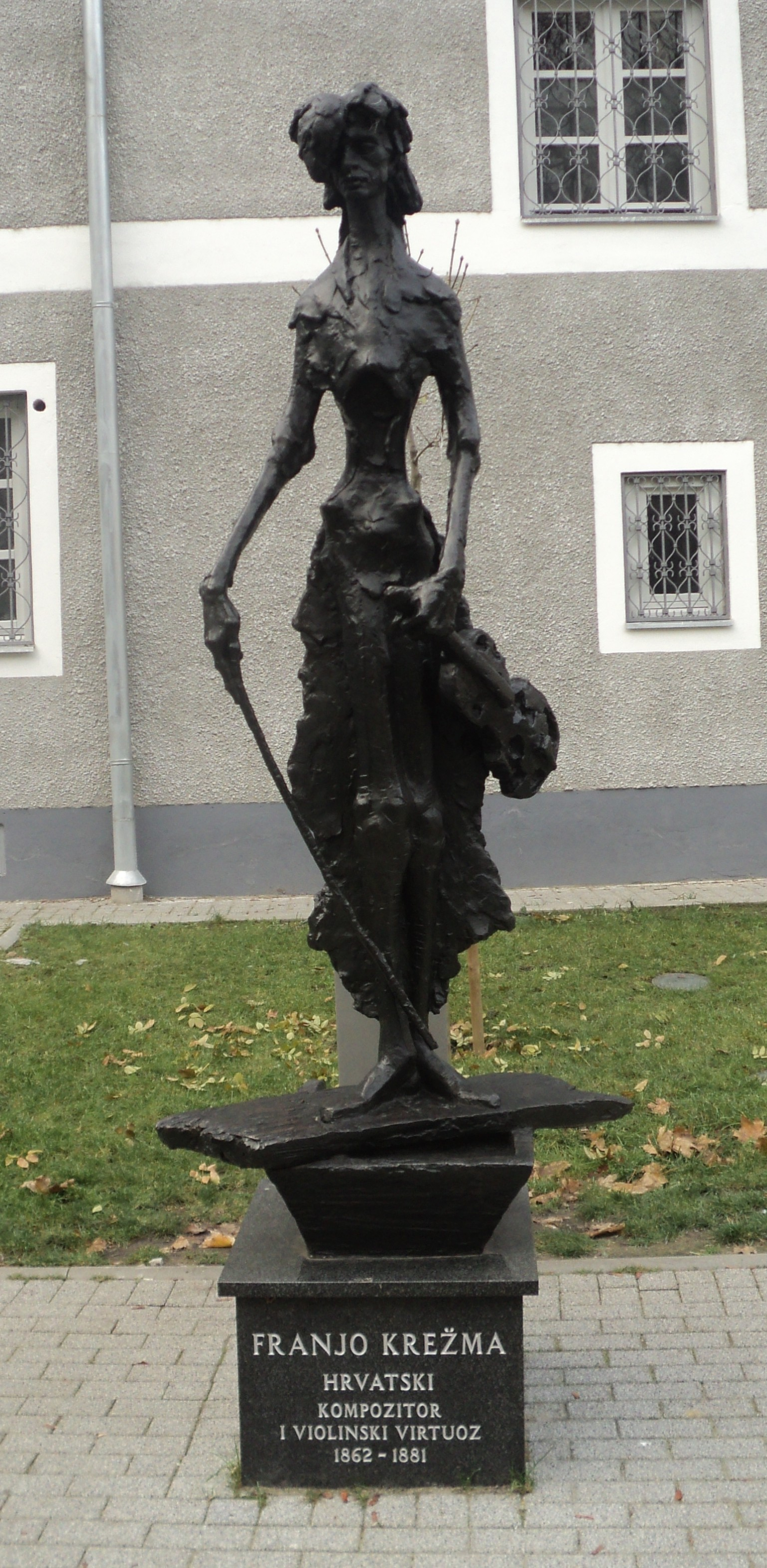
Statue in Osijek

== Death and legacy ==
After a successful concert in Frankfurt am Main, Germany on 6 June 1881, Krežma developed an inflammation of the inner ear, which developed into meningitis in the following days. Following a belated surgery he never regained consciousness, dying on 15 June at the age of 18.

Franjo Krežma was known to musicians such as Giuseppe Verdi, Henry Vieuxtemps, and Franz Liszt. Following a fire at his parents' home that destroyed a portion of his work and his violin, his surviving compositions include one symphony, three overtures, several marches and dances for orchestra, works for string quartet, and pieces for violin.

== Notable works ==
Rêverie za violinu i veliki orkestar u As-duru (1880)

== Selected recordings ==
- Krezma - Lieder Natasa Antoniazzo, Mia Elezovic. Bella Musica 2021
