= Der Schmied von Ruhla =

Der Schmied von Ruhla (English:The Blacksmith of Ruhla) is a German opera by Friedrich Lux with a libretto by Ludwig C. Bauer. It was premiered at the Stadtheater in Mainz on 28 March 1882.
