= Hildor Lundvik =

Swedish musician and composer (1885–1951)

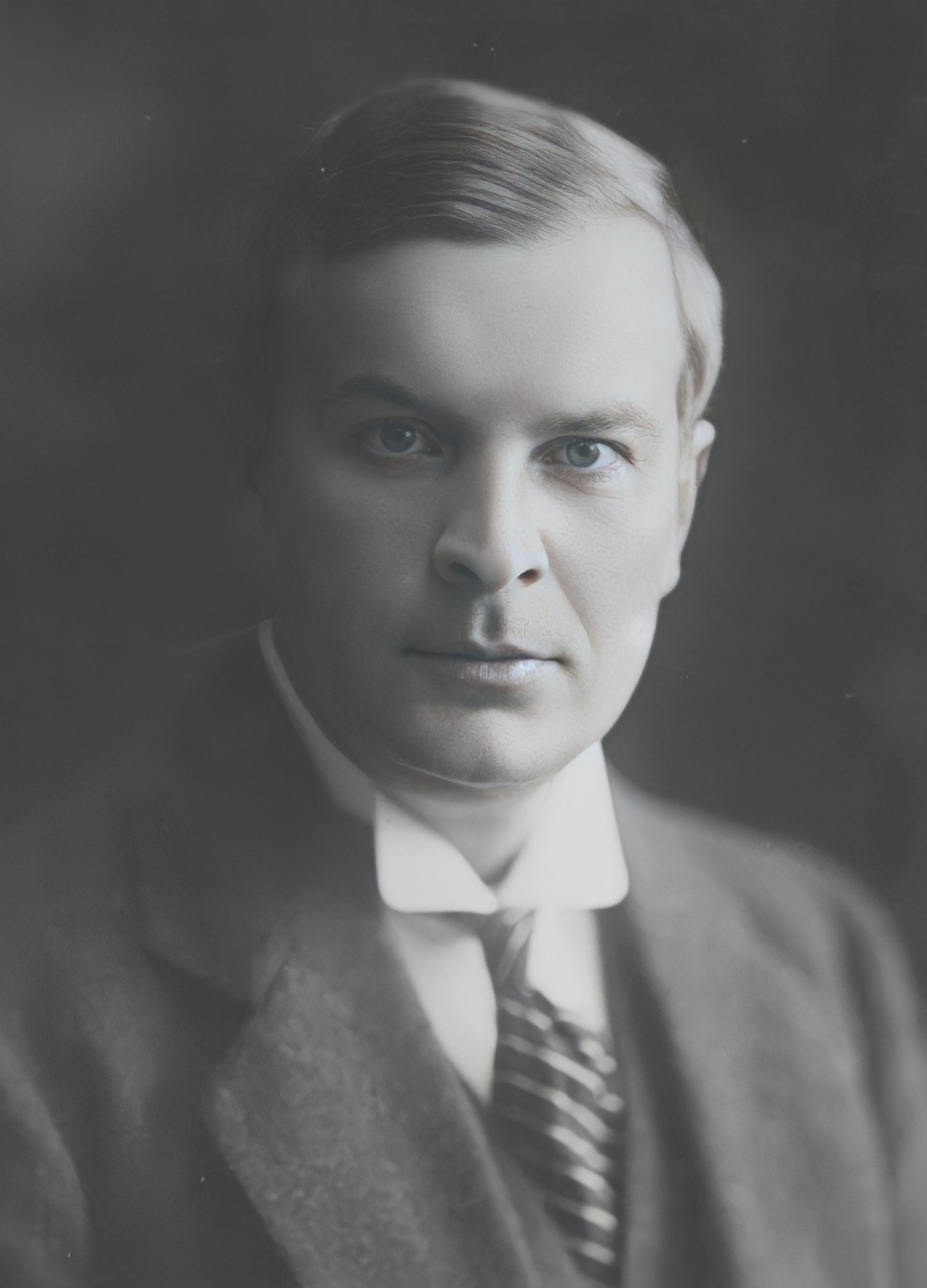
- Lundvik in 1885
- Born: 6 March 1885; Gävle, Gästrikland, Sweden
- Died: 24 January 1951 (aged 65); Stockholm, Sweden
- Education: Uppsala University; Royal Swedish Academy of Music
- Occupations: Organist; composer; conductor; music educator
- Years active: 1920s–1951
- Style: Classical
- Spouse: Johanna Magdalena Näsman

Hildor Lundvik (6 March 1885 – 24 January 1951) was a Swedish organist and composer.

== Biography ==
Lundvik was born in Gävle. He first studied law at Uppsala University, then music at the Royal Swedish Academy of Music in Stockholm, graduating as a music teacher in 1912, as precentor and organist (Västerås) in 1919 and as singing teacher in 1913. He became organist of St Göran, Stockholm, 1928, directed the Bellman Male-Choir from 1930 to 1950, and was Principal Conductor of the Stockholm Federation of Male Voice Choirs. Lundvik's main achievement as a composer was in the field of vocal music, although he also produced a small number of short orchestral works (Liten svit and Två elegiska melodier) and various piano compositions. His choral songs "Som ett blommande mandelträd" and "Det första vårregnet" (both 1932) and "Verlaine-stämning" (1937) have stood the test of time with their natural freshness unimpaired. His cantata "Sången", a succession of male voice quartets, and several solo songs are also memorable. Lundvik wrote in a fairly romantic, lyrical style, using vivid impressionist tone colouring.

He was married to Johanna Magdalena Näsman. He died in Stockholm.
