= Stockholm Army =

- Stockholmsarmén
- Active: 1719–1721
- Country: Sweden
- Type: Infantry and Cavalry
- Size: 8,000–9,000
- Engagements: Russian Pillage of 1719–1721; Skirmish at Knapens Hål; Battle of Stäket

Commanders
- Commander: Carl Gustaf Dücker

The Stockholm Army (Swedish: Stockholmsarmén) was an army consisting of 8,000–9,000 troops formed in 1719 in order to defend Sweden's capital city, Stockholm, from Russian attacks during the Great Northern War.

== Russian attacks ==
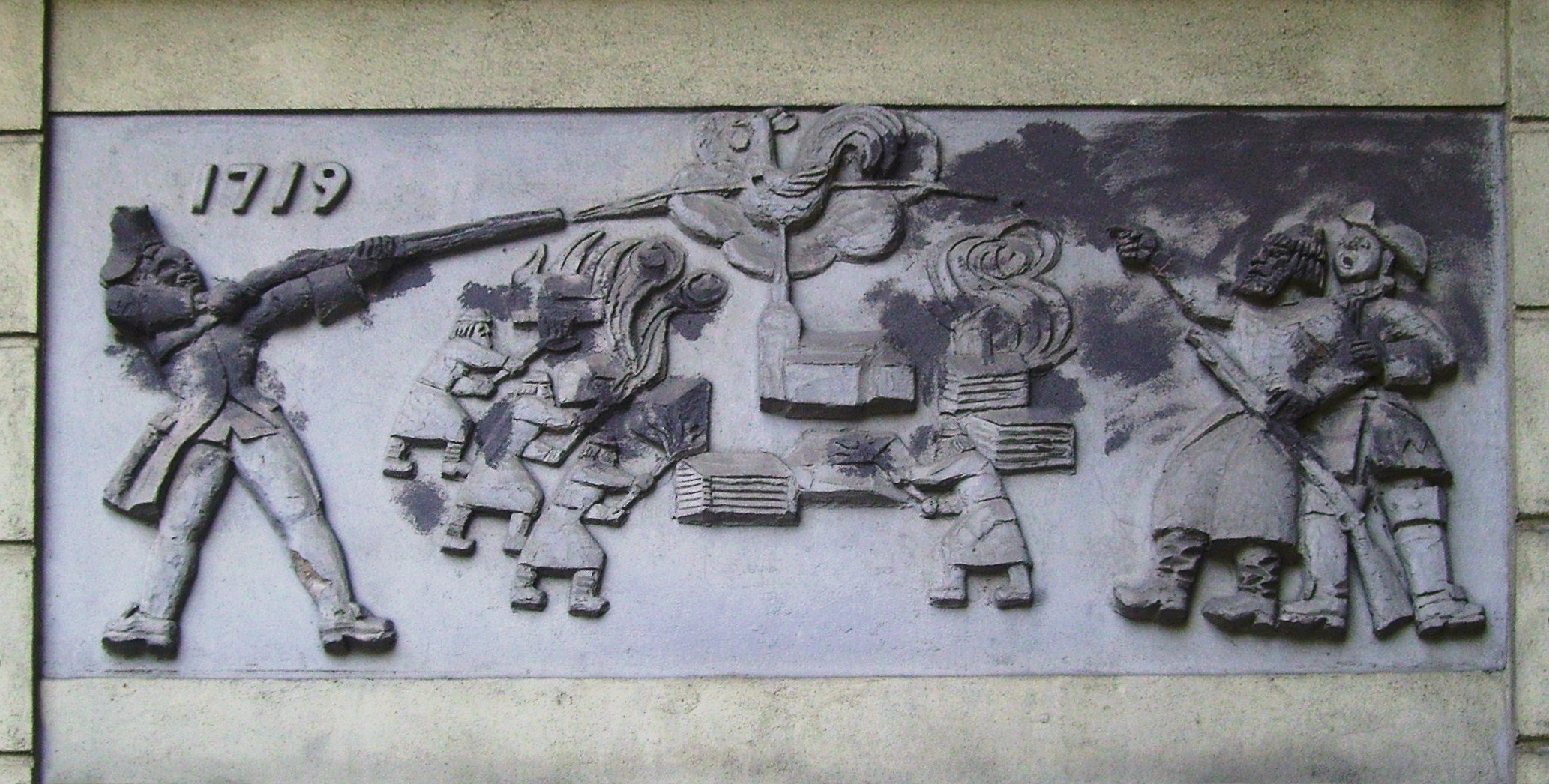
Relief depicting the Russian atrocities in 1719.

In the summer of 1719, the galley fleet of Russia which consisted of about 130 galleys, 100 smaller ships and 26,000 Infantry and Cavalry was assembled for an attack towards Sweden and on July 11, the first Russian ships had arrived at Kapellskär. Their instructions were to plunder and ravage the Swedish coast, but not to "bother" the civilian population unnecessarily. Along the coast, everything valuable was destroyed. The Swedish defense forces were unable to intervene. The Russian galleys quickly travelled between the islands and islets, and it was almost impossible for the Swedes to know where they would strike next.

== Establishment ==
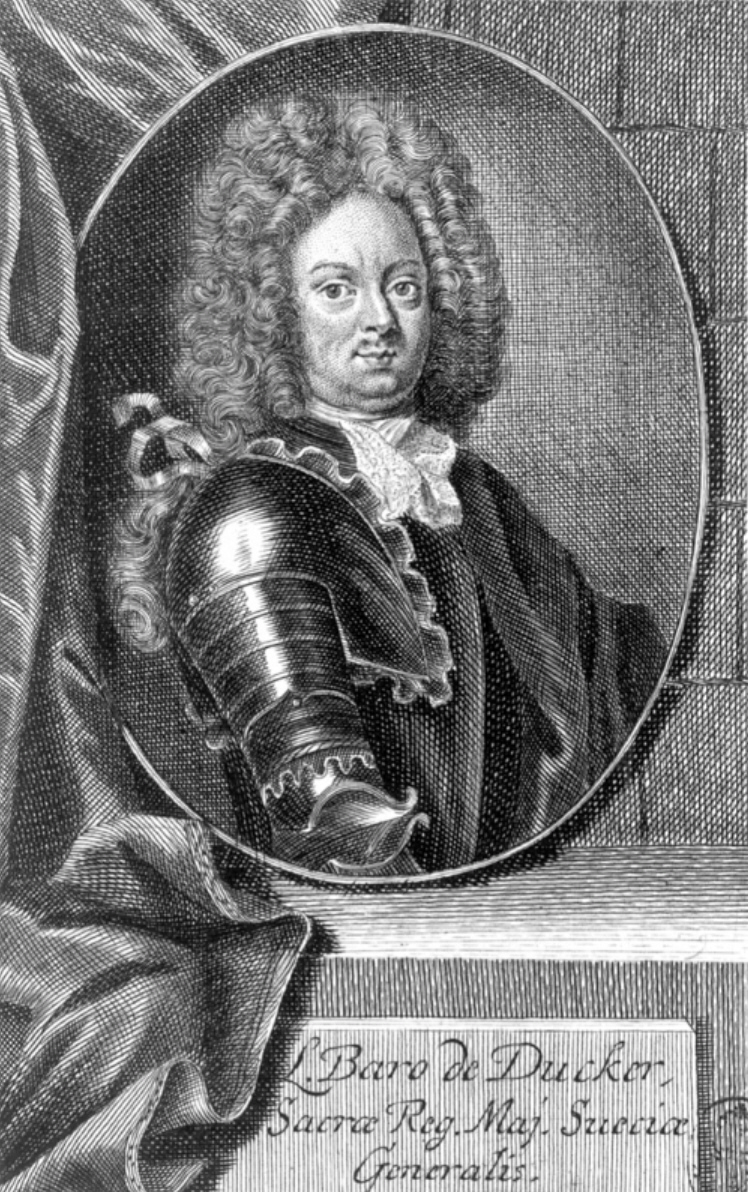
The commander of the Stockholm army, Carl Gustaf Ducker.

In Sweden, the people had long been aware that attacks on the coast were to be expected. The Swedish resources weren't enough to defend all coastal areas, and the Swedish strategy was to mainly defend the capital. The defense leadership, which consisted of the Queen's husband, Frederick I, and Carl Gustaf Dücker, was criticized for this strategy. To meet the Russian attack, the so-called Stockholm Army was created, consisting of 19 regiments with approximately 8,000-9,000 men. In addition, there was also the Stockholm squadron with, among other things, galleys and "shot barges". The Swedish forces lacked sufficient equipment and numbers to defend the city properly due to the urgency of the situation.

== Defense of Stockholm ==
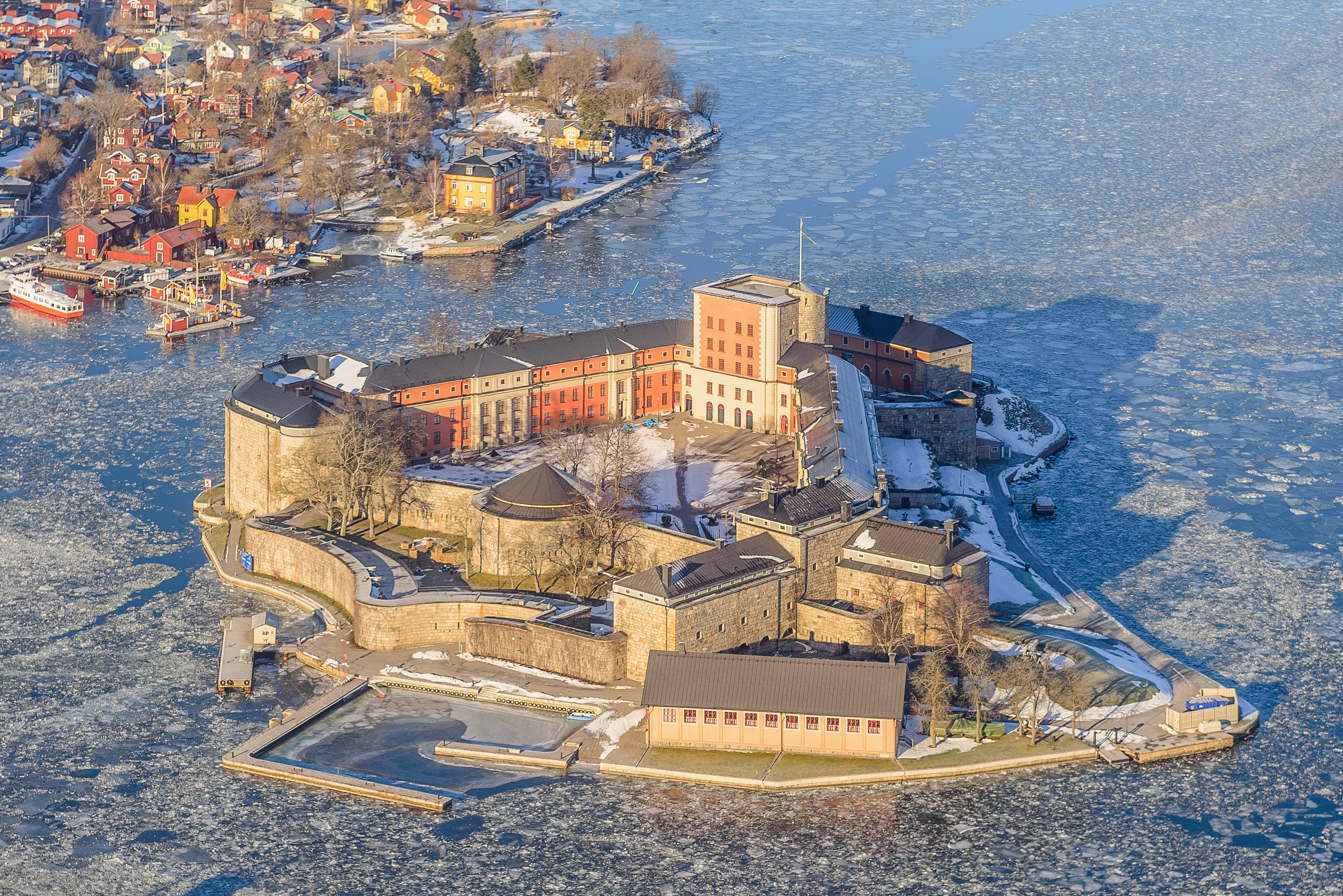
Aerial view of Vaxholm fortress taken in 2013.

A cornerstone to Stockholm's defenses was Vaxholm fortress. But there was another waterway leading into the city, the one across from Baggensfjärden and through Baggensstäket. From the beginning this trail was not particularly noticed in the Swedish defense planning, and only one galley was sent to defend it. When the Russian galley fleet reached Dalarö, it was decided to strengthen its defenses.

On July 16, the Russians made their first attempt at breaking through at Baggensstäket. However, the attack was repulsed relatively easily by the Swedes, and made the Swedish leadership more aware that Baggensstäket was a back road towards Stockholm. The defenses were further expanded by Baltzar von Dalheim. On August 13, the Russian raids on the Swedish coast were basically finished. They were on their way back towards Åland, but the head of the Russian force, Fyodor Apraksin, decided to make a final attempt in attacking Stockholm.

On July 20, Peter Lacy corps with 3,500 men appeared on the shores of Sweden, His main goal was to inflict as much damage on the Swedes as possible. On the very first day near Kapel, he defeated an advanced Swedish detachment and captured 3 cannons from them. Five days later, another battle took place, the Swedes escaped encirclement and quickly retreated, throwing 7 more guns on the field. On August 16, the detachment returned, having lost only 6 killed and 15 wounded.

== Battle of Stäket ==
On August 13, Stockholm was exposed to a deadly threat, the Russians made an attempt to capture the capital. They began passing through the Fällström Strait towards Baggensfjärden and 6,000 men were landed at the southern Stäket. They came into contact with a field fortification erected by Baltzar von Dalheim, and it was defended by soldiers of the Östgöta and Södermanland's three–man regiment amounting to about 1,200 men. The Russians likely found the defenses to be too strong, and decided to retreat. Next, the Russians moved to attack the redoubt built at the entrance of the strait, at the narrow point known as "Knapens hål" This redoubt was crucial to the Swedish defense. If it were to fall, the Russians would be able to bring galleys into the strait and support following attacks on the next redoubt, neutralizing the Swedish defense and the capital opened to ravaging.

The objective of capturing the southern redoubt fell to Barantinski's grenadiers. The Swedish defense at Knapens hål consisted of a few hundred men likely under the leadership of Captain Fritz Wachtmeister. Not a lot is known about this battle, but it is clear that the Russians failed in their objective. However, Apraksin was not ready to give up. The Russians had likely realized the importance of the redoubt at Knapens hål, and decided to attack again. The third attack was a combined attack, Strekolov's force bombarded the redoubt from the north and Baratinski's grenadiers from the south. Furthermore, five galleys and five smaller ships attacked from the sea. But the defenders of the redoubt once again repelled their attack.

Despite the lack of sources, it is known that the Swedish defense command had become aware of the critical situation at Stäket. Reinforcements were sent and both Frederick I and Dücker went to the aid of the defenders.

The Södermanland regiment, led by Rutger Fuchs, was the first to arrive. What happened next is unclear. In Swedish historiography, it has often been said that the Södermanland regiment attacked the Russians with their bayonets and drove them into the water. Later research, mainly by the military historian Arne Stades, has shown that this is likely wrong. The only thing that is certain is that the Södermanland regiment found the Russians on the south of the strait prepared for battle, and that a battle ensued. The battle cost the Swedes between seventy and one hundred dead and eight hundred wounded. The Russian losses are unknown.

Later, the Dalarna Regiment and the Västmanland regiment also arrived at Stäket. On the Russian side, they decided to give up the attempt to raze Stockholm and retreated back to their ships.
