= Hamn (museum) =

Museum in Fisksättra, Sweden

Museum Hamn
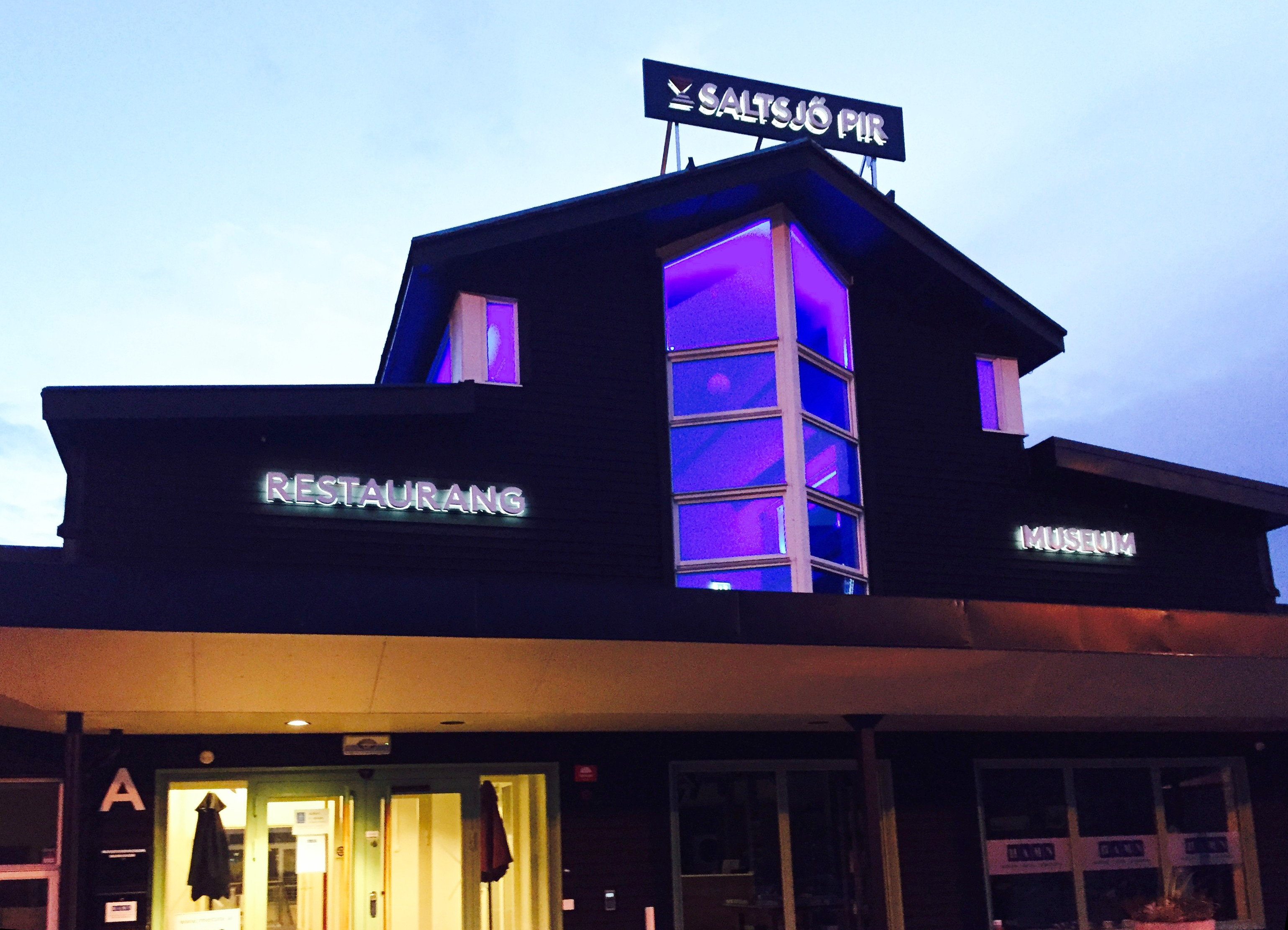
- Established: 1 June 2014
- Dissolved: spring 2023
- Location: Fisksätra, Stockholm, Sweden
- Coordinates: 59°17′43.49″N 18°15′35.04″E
- Website: hamnmuseum.se

Hamn was a battlefield museum in Fisksätra, Nacka Municipality, near Stockholm, Sweden about the Battle of Stäket on 13 August 1719 when Russian force, circumventing Vaxholm Castle, attempted to pass through Baggensstäket, a very narrow passage in the Stockholm archipelago. After a desperate counterattack by Södermanlands regemente the Russian force departed. It is debated whether or not this was a Russian attempt to reach Stockholm.

The museum was founded as a result of a still ongoing archaeological research project. In 2003, the project "Battlefield Archaeology by Stäket" was formed, which was consented by the Swedish National Heritage Board, the County Government and Nacka Municipality. Databases, registries and maps etc. were studied and a reference group with scholars was formed. In spring 2004 sample examinations on the southern side, by the so-called Marsh Meadow, were initiated. During the years 2004–2010, the last five of which under the management of the Swedish National heritage Board, the battlefields were completely examined by the Baggensstäket inlet. The battlefields got classified as "ancient monuments", and the battlefield on the southern side was the first of its kind to be classified as such. In total, 735000 m2 have been scanned and about 1300 objects of antiquarian and culturally historical value have been found. In June 2010, the project with the museum HAMN, which was financed by Nacka Municipality and the EU, was initiated.

Today, a book project about the southern side of the Battle of Stäket with results from ten years of research, is ongoing.

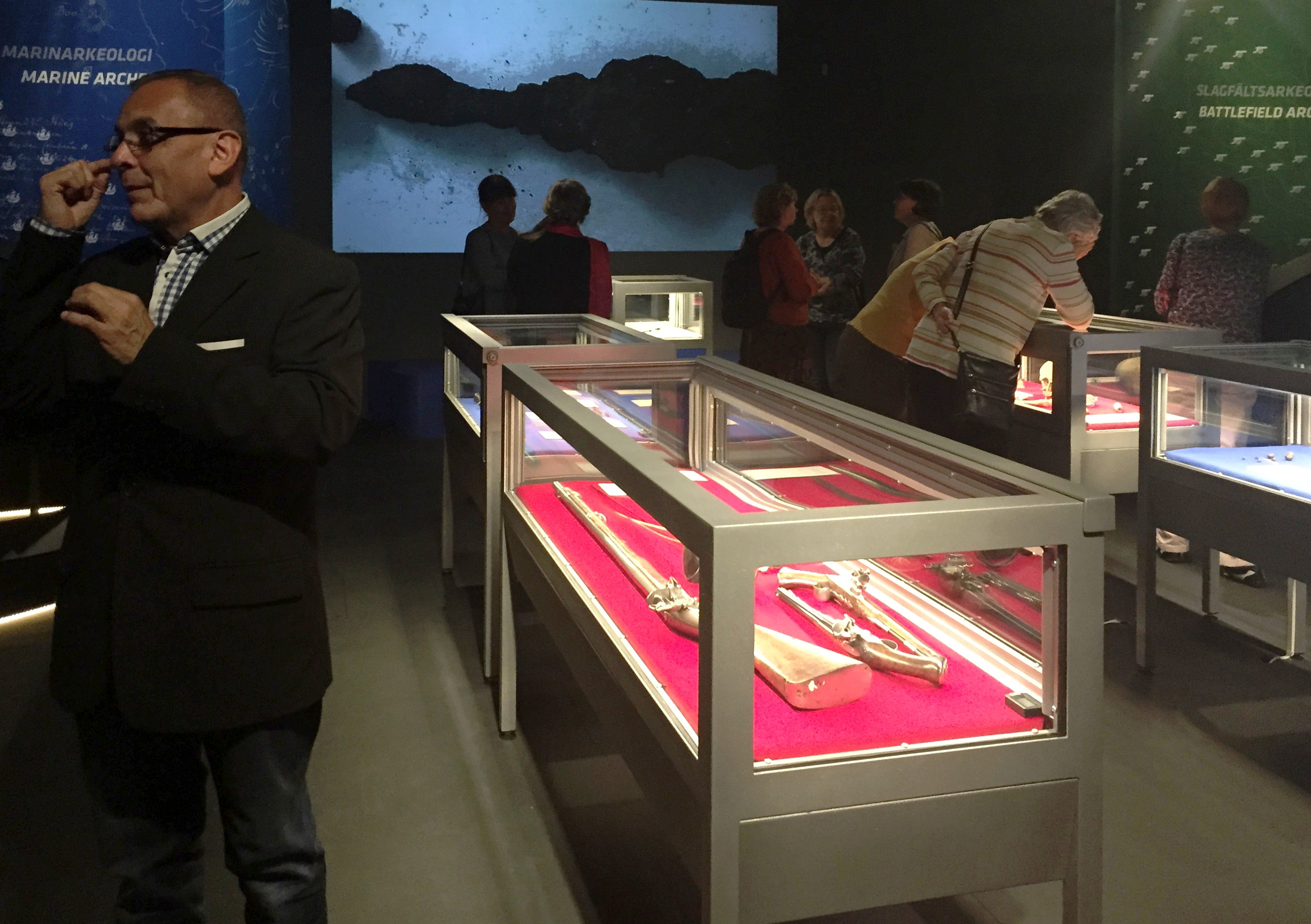

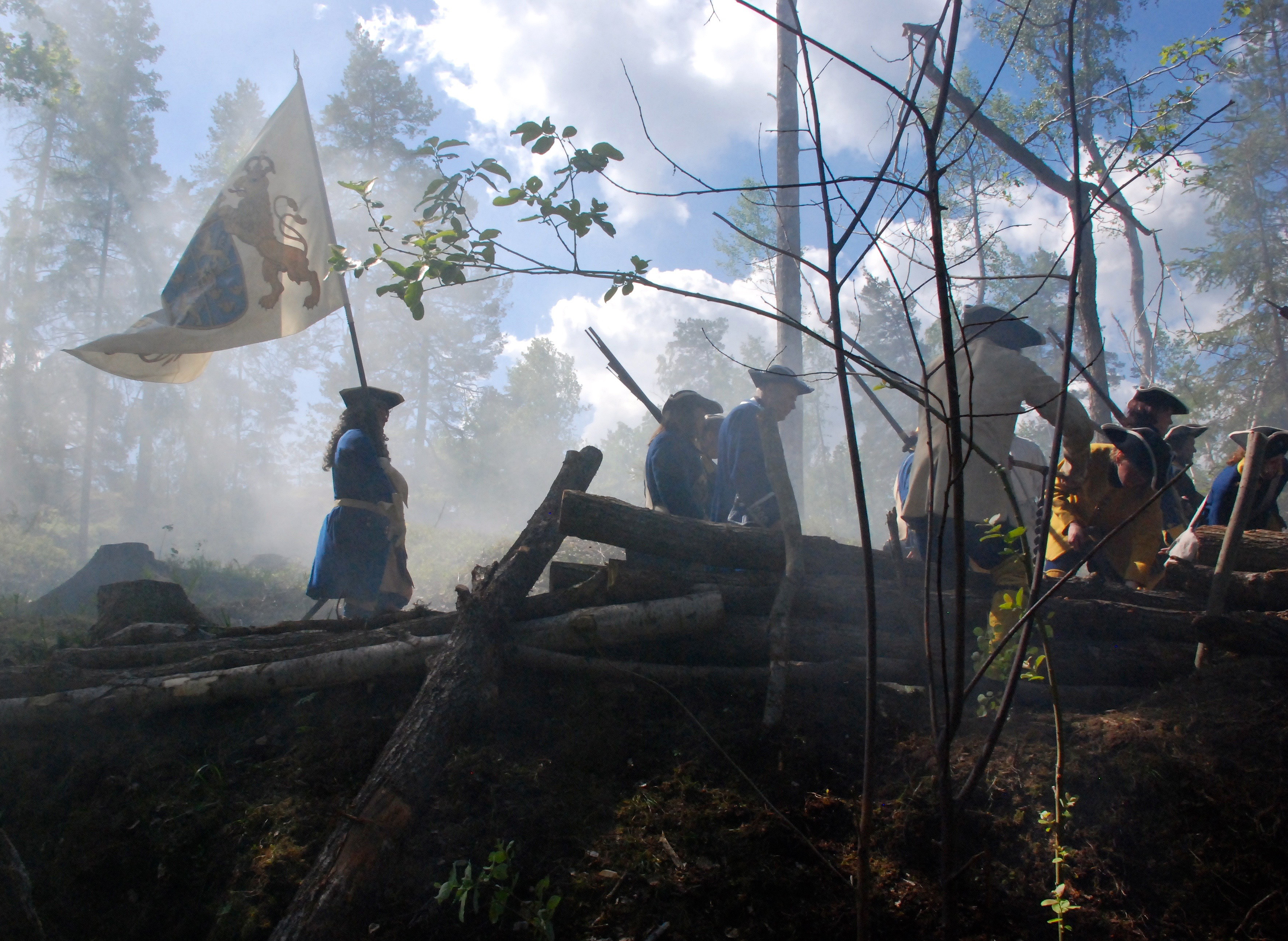

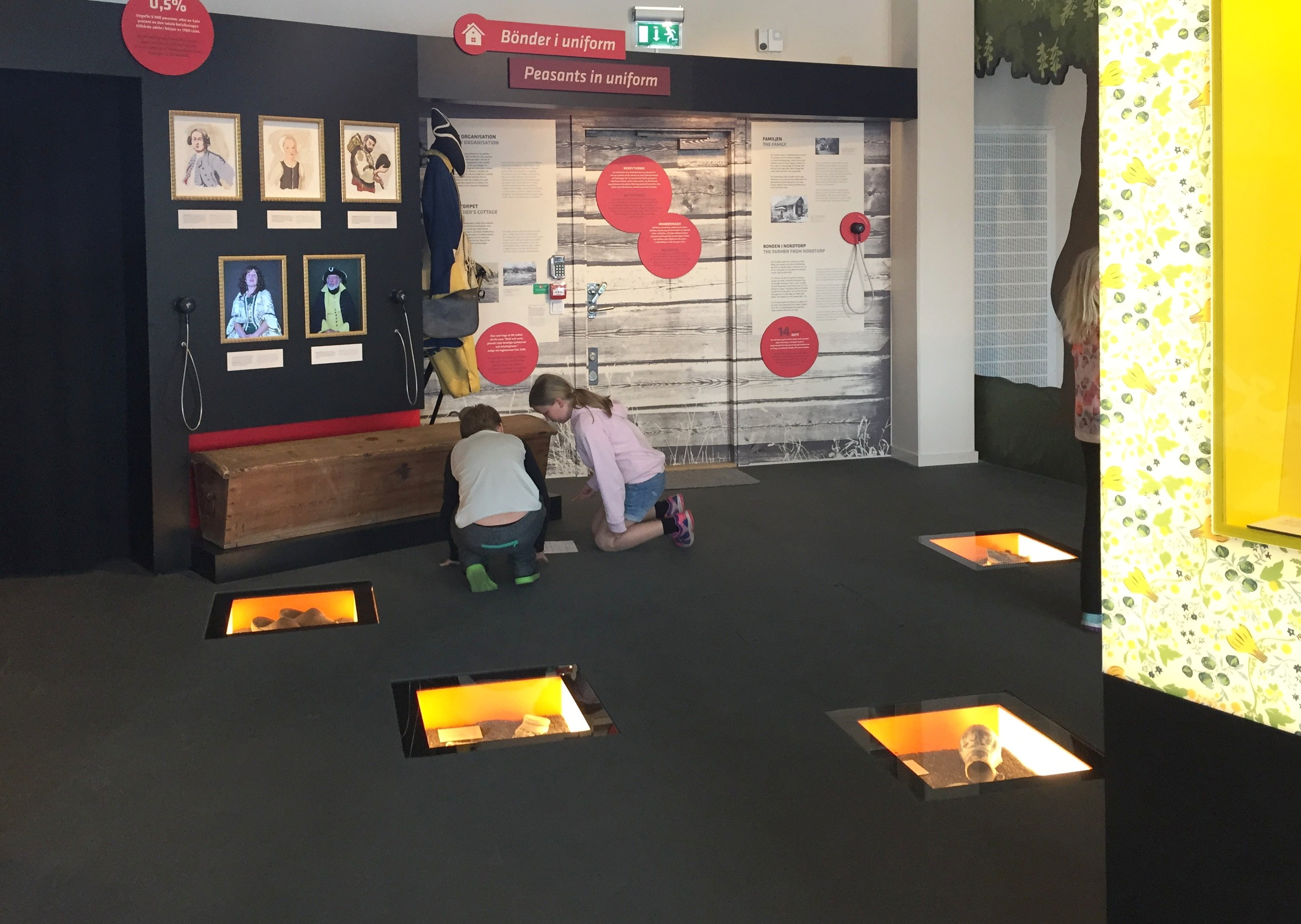

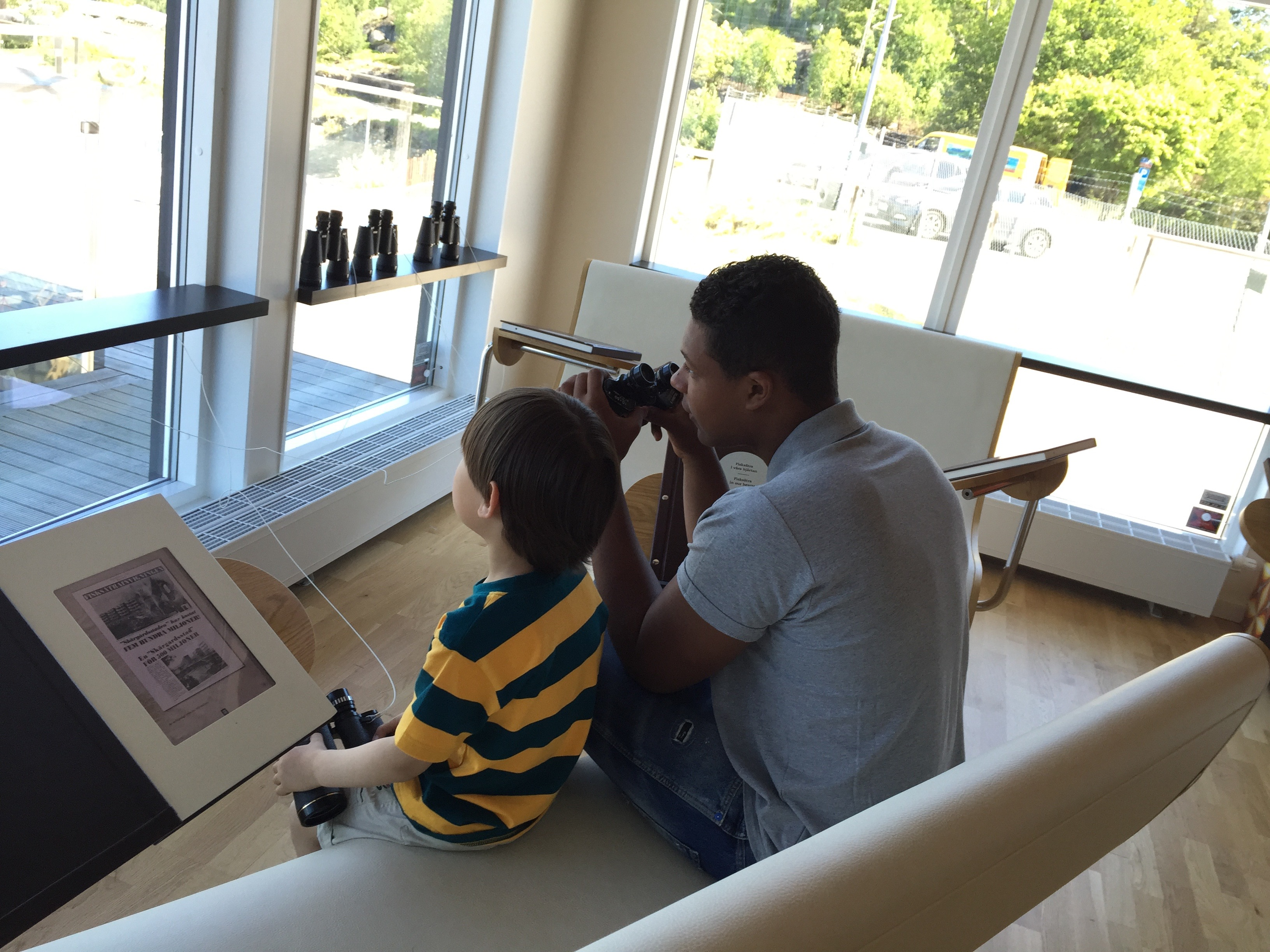

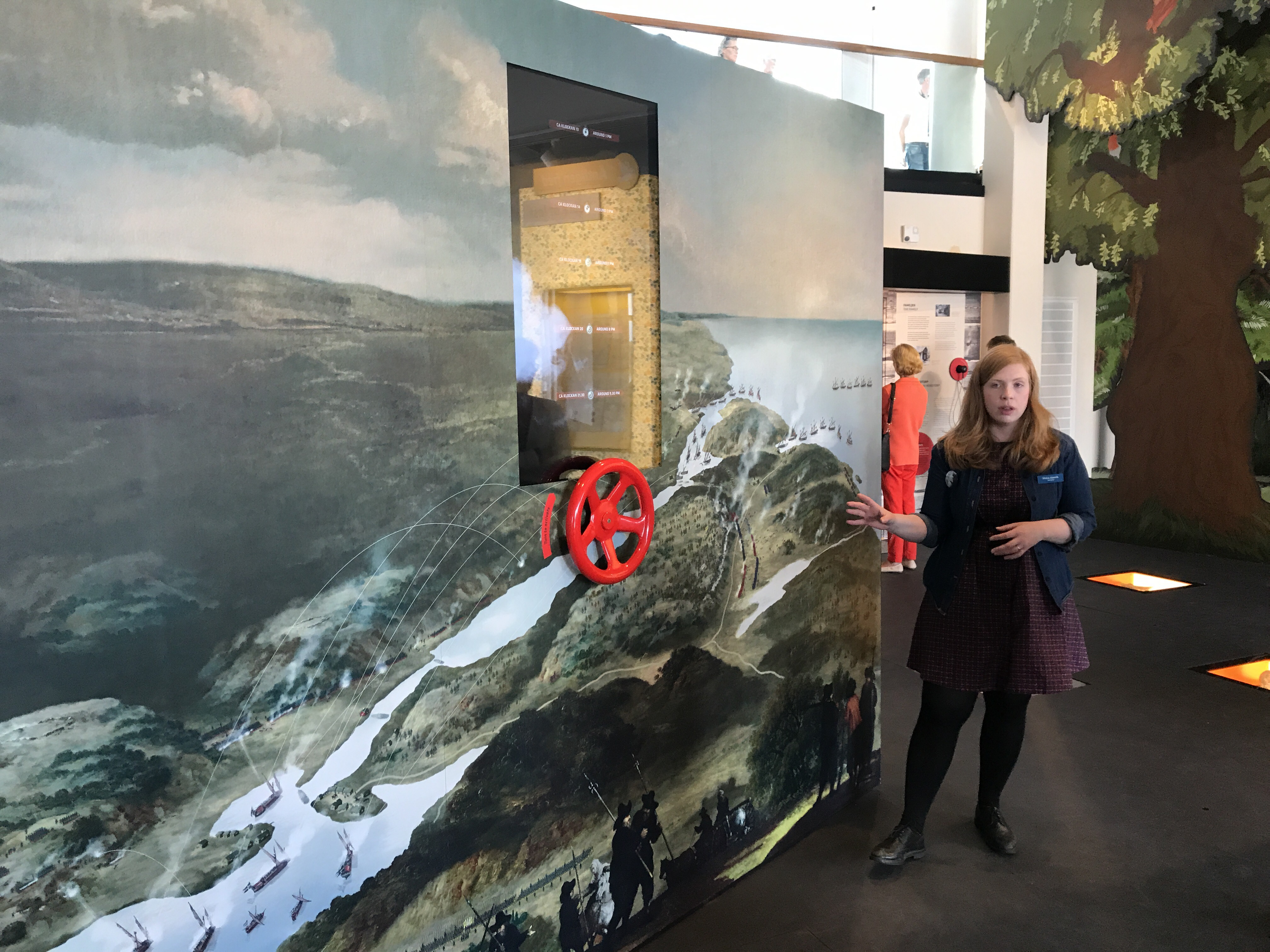
