= Rutger Fuchs =

Swedish army officer (1682–1753)

Friherre Rutger Fuchs
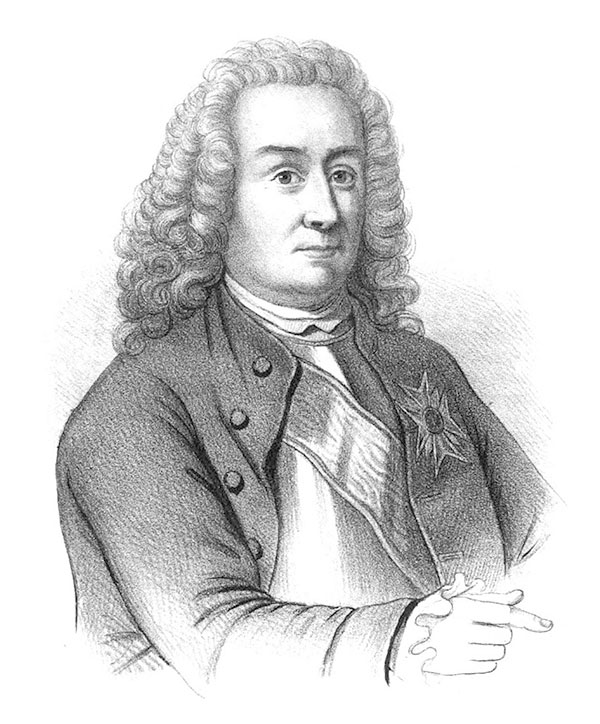
- Born: 2 April 1682; Malmö, Sweden
- Died: 10 April 1753 (aged 71); Stockholm
- Military career
- Allegiance: Sweden
- Branch: Swedish Army
- Service years: 1699–1739
- Rank: Major general
- Commands: Södermanlands Regiment
- Conflicts: Great Northern War; Battle of Gadebusch; 1716 invasion of Norway; 1718 invasion of Norway; Battle of Stäket
- Awards: Order of the Seraphim

Friherre Rutger Fuchs (2 April 1682 – 10 April 1753) was a Swedish army officer and politician who served as Governor of Stockholm from 1739 until his death in 1753. A soldier during the Great Northern War, Fuchs is best remembered for his role during the Battle of Stäket in 1719 where he stalled a Russian landing force intending to raid Stockholm.

== Biography ==
Rutger Fuchs was born on 2 April 1682 in Malmö. His parents were Christian Fuchs and Susanna Eleonora Leijonsten.

In 1699, at the age of seventeen, Fuchs joined the army as a volunteer in the Swedish Life Regiment of Foot. The following year, he served as an ensign in the Västgöta Three-Männing Regiment. He was promoted to lieutenant in 1702 and then to the rank of captain in 1704. That same year Fuchs was a part of a Västgöta battalion that was sent to help relieve the city of Narva, which was once again besieged by the Russians. The relief force failed to reach Narva and had to travel by sea to Reval. Fuchs participated in Admiral Cornelius Anckarstjerna's failed attack on Kotlin Island – which was planned to be used as a staging point for an attack on Saint Petersburg – and was wounded. The battalion returned to Sweden in 1707, though Fuchs would remain in Livonia until 1708.

In 1709, he helped reorganise the Dalarna Regiment following its loss at Poltava and was given the rank of major the very next year. At the onset of Magnus Stenbock's expedition to Pomerania and Mecklenburg in late 1712, Fuchs was promoted to lieutenant colonel after the previous officer who held that rank died. During the Battle of Gadebusch in December 1712, the Dalarna Regiment engaged the Danish Royal Life Guards where Fuchs reportedly fought the Life Guards commander in hand-to-hand combat. Though Fuchs killed his opponent, the fight left him badly wounded and he was taken to Wismar to recover. He also sustained a severe injury to one of his legs which forced him to walk on crutches for a year.

After recovering from his injuries, Fuchs was stationed in the province of Uppland from 1714 to 1715 in order to safeguard the coast from Russians attacks. He then participated in the 1716 invasion of Norway. Fuchs served with distinction during the campaign, and was promoted to colonel and given command of the Södermanlands Regiment after its previous commander, C. R. von Schlippenbach, was mortally wounded during an assault on the Fredriksten Fortress. Fuchs also participated in the 1718 invasion of Norway.

In 1719, the Södermanlands Regiment became a part of the newly formed Stockholm Army. The purpose of this army was to protect Stockholm from enemy threats after the Russians began carrying out coastal attacks during the summer of that year. The Södermanlands along with the Dalarna and the Västmanland regiments were stationed near Baggensstäket to prevent the Russians from attacking the city through the narrow strait. On 13 August the Russians landed a force of 3,000 men in an attempt to gain entry to the strait. In the ensuing Battle of Stäket, Fuchs led his regiment in a counterattack which stalled the Russian advance. After further reinforcements arrived the Russians abandoned their attempted raid and withdrew back to their galleys. For his actions during the battle, Fuchs was raised to the rank of major general and given the title of Friherre (Baron).

In 1727, an offer to become a councilor was given to Fuchs, but he declined it as he believed he lacked the knowledge required for such a position. Fuchs was initially a supporter of Arvid Horn and his party, the Caps; however, during the 1738–1739 Diet, he joined the Caps' political opponents the Hats, who advocated for war with Russia in order to regain Sweden's lost territories. Later in 1739, Fuchs was made Governor of Stockholm. In 1740, after realising that Sweden's army was in a poor condition to fight the Russians, Fuchs defected to the Caps and openly opposed the Hats' war policy. Following Sweden's defeat in its 1741–1743 war with Russia, Fuchs was one of the men who sentenced Charles Emil Lewenhaupt to death, which caused further outrage against him from the Hats.

In 1751, he was awarded the Order of the Seraphim. Fuchs died on 10 April 1753 in Stockholm.

== Marriages ==
Fuchs married three times. He married his first wife Margaretha (Margareta) Eleonore Stackelberg (1676 – before 1715) in 1706. The couple had six children together, however, all of their children would die in infancy. In February 1715, he married his second wife Margareta Gyllenpistol; the two would remain together until Margareta's death in 1748. Fuchs would marry his last wife Countess Sigrid Margareta Mörner, daughter of the field marshal and councilor Carl Gustaf Mörner, in May 1750.
