= Baltzar von Dahlheim =

Carl Baltzar von Dahlheim (1669–1756) was a German-Swedish military fortification officer, born in the Electorate of Saxony, who distinguished himself serving Sweden during the Great Northern War.

== Early life ==
After a short education, Dahlheim became a mercenary already as a teenager, participated in the battle of Vienna in 1683, and later in the English Glorious Revolution of 1688 under William III of Orange.

== Great Northern War ==
At the time of the outbreak of the Great Northern War, Dahlheim joined a Swedish regiment and distinguished himself as military engineer during Charles XII's campaign in Poland after the battle of Narva. At the battle of Poltava in 1709 Dahlheim was wounded but managed to follow Charles XII to Bendery where he spent over four years. In 1711 he was ennobled and took the name von Dahlheim.

After leaving Bendery Dahlheim was promoted to the rank of colonel and participated in the fighting around the fortress of Stralsund. He was severely wounded again, captured, and spent two years convalescing in captivity in Berlin. In 1718 he was released and appointed quartermaster general in Charles XII's army of Bohuslän in preparation of the king's second campaign against Norway. The latter came to an abrupt end with the death of the king at Fredrikssten.

In 1719 Dahlheim made his most renowned military achievement, as organizer and leader of the defence of Baggensstäket against the invading Russian skärgårdsflottan. With scarce resources, he succeeded holding his ground during the battle of Stäket, despite being severely wounded yet again, until reinforcements arrived.

== Later life ==
After the battle of Stäke Dahlheim's career took a turn to the worse, and he was discharged under bad terms in 1722, at the age of 52. In 1723 he purchased the Stångberga estate i Vallentuna parish where he lived under meagre circumstances, earning his livelihood principally from agriculture. In 1748 he became the first recipient of the Order of the Sword, but could not wear the decoration since he had pawned his finest coat.

Memorials attesting to the achievements of Dahlheim and others exist at Baggensstäket and Strömstad.
