= Öringesjön =

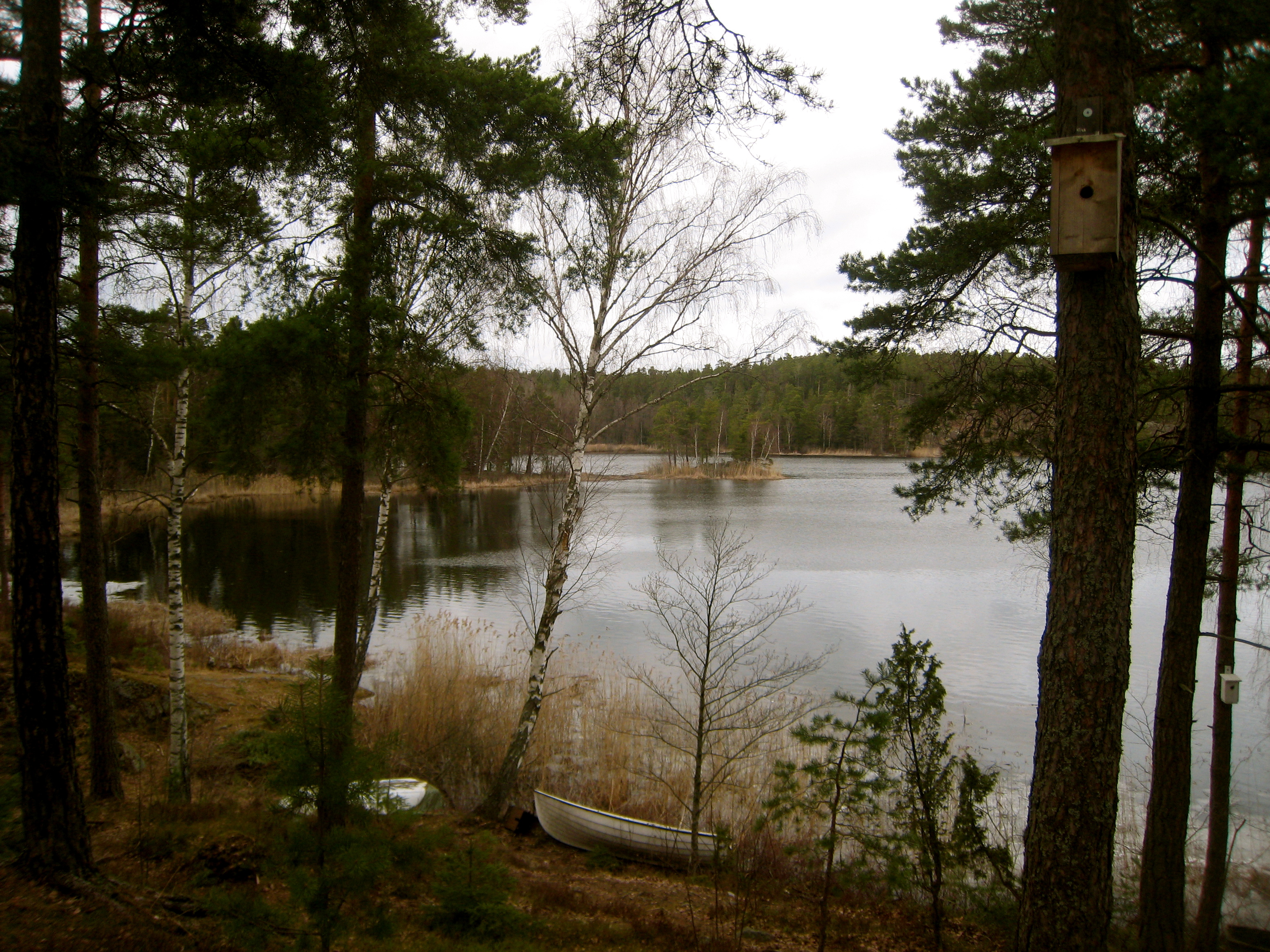

- Location within Stockholm
- Location: Södermanland, Sweden
- Coordinates: 59°15′10.4″N 18°15′21.0″E
- Type: lake
- Basin countries: Sweden

Öringesjön is a lake in Stockholm County, Södermanland, Sweden. It is located on the border of Nacka Municipality and Tyresö Municipality.
