= Finntorp =

Housing area in Nacka, Sweden

Coordinates: 59°18′29″N 18°07′59″E

Finntorp is a housing area in the municipality of Nacka, east of Stockholm, Sweden. Modern Finntorp was built from the 1940s.
