= Carl Gustaf Dücker =

Swedish field marshal (1663–1732)

His Excellency, Count Carl Gustaf Dücker
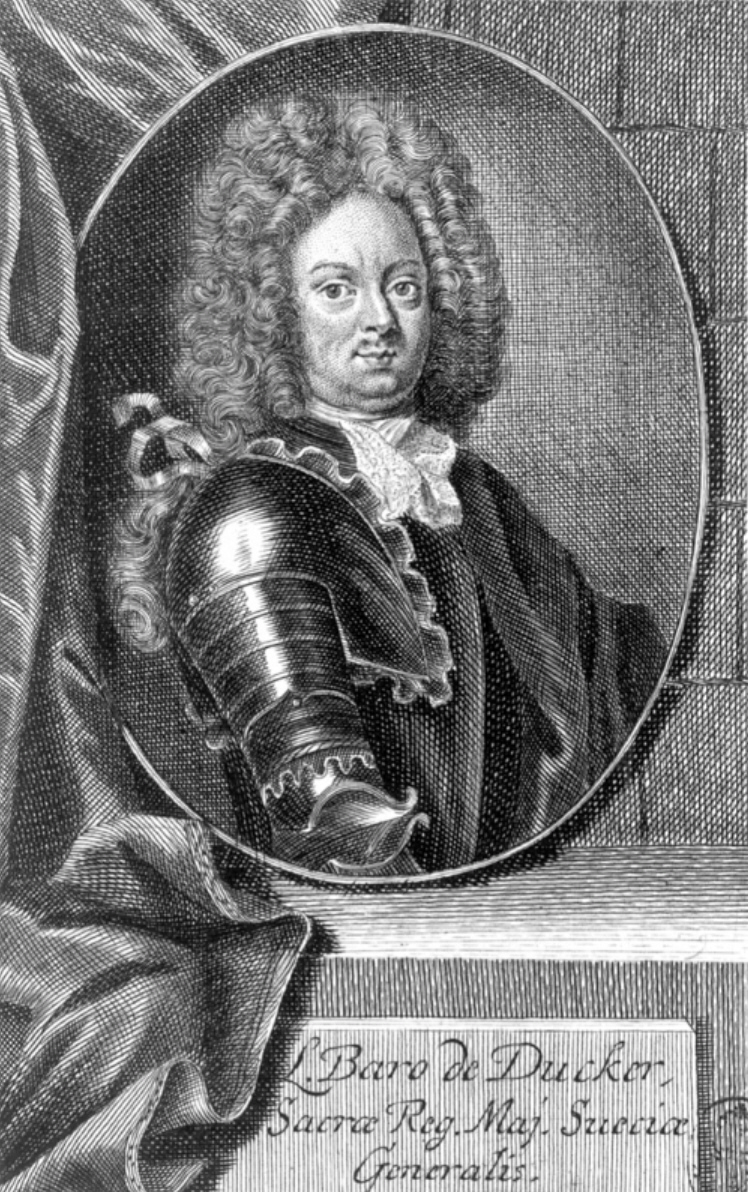
- Engraving by Martin Bernigeroth
- Born: 1663; Swedish Livonia
- Died: 3 July 1732 (aged 68–69); Stockholm, Sweden
- Burial place: Riddarholmen Church
- Spouse(s): Theodora Oginska (m. 1707; died 1719) Hedvig Wilhelmina Oxenstierna (m. 1720)
- Children: 2
- Military career
- Allegiance: (Kingdom of France) France; Sweden
- Service years: 1688–1732
- Rank: Field Marshal (Fältmarskalk)
- Commands: Västergötland Cavalry Regiment; Stockholm Army
- Conflicts: Nine Years' War; Great Northern War; Siege of Riga; Battle of Narva (WIA); Crossing of the Düna; Battle of Kliszów; Storming of Lemberg; Battle of Punitz; Battle of Valkininkai; Battle of Kalisz; Battle of Oposhnya; Battle of Krasnokutsk–Gorodnoye; Battle of Poltava; Battle of Helsingborg; Siege of Stralsund; Battle of Gadebusch (WIA); Siege of Fredriksten; Battle of Stäket

Count Carl Gustaf Dücker (1663 – 3 July 1732) was a Swedish field marshal (Fältmarskalk) and Royal Councillor.

Born in Livonia, Dücker began his career fighting for the French in the Nine Years' war. At the start of the Great Northern War, Dücker became a subordinate to King Charles XII and served under him with distinction during the Polish and Russian campaigns. Dücker was taken prisoner following the disastrous battle of Poltava, but was released soon after in a prisoner exchange. Upon returning to service, he fought against Coalition forces in Swedish Pomerania, most notably during the siege of Stralsund. After being taken prisoner once again, he returned to Sweden in early 1718 and participated in the siege of Fredriksten.

In January 1719, he was promoted to the rank of field marshal and received the title of count and a seat in the Royal Council. Dücker was also put in charge of the War College but did not become president. Dücker died in 1732 in Stockholm.

== Early life ==
Carl Gustaf Dücker was born in Swedish Livonia in 1663 to Major Carl Fredrik Dücker and Anna Elisabeth Sass. His ancestors originally came from Westphalia before they immigrated to the Baltic region in the 15th century. Dücker would lose his father at a young age after he was killed in a duel.

In 1688, he joined the French Army and served in the Fürstenberg Regiment during the Nine Years' War, seeing action in the campaigns in Catalonia, Piedmont and Flanders. Originally starting out as a cadet, Dücker was soon promoted to an ensign the same year as enlisting. He was promoted to lieutenant in 1691 and then to captain aide-major in 1695. Dücker would return to Sweden following the end of the conflict.

== Great Northern War ==
=== Rise to prominence ===
Following the outbreak of the Great Northern War in 1700, Dücker assisted in the defence of Riga after it came under siege by a Saxon Army. On 14 November, he was given the rank of adjutant general and served in King Charles XII's General Staff during the Battle of Narva, where he was wounded. During the Invasion of Poland-Lithuania, Dücker accompanied the king in a rowboat during the crossing of Düna and served as an intelligence officer at the Battle of Kilszów. In August 1702, he was given a diplomatic mission by Charles in which he was tasked with urging Austrian diplomat Philipp Ludwig von Sinzendorf to not visit the king whilst he was on campaign and to instead return to Kraków. Upon his return, Charles then tasked him with negotiating the surrender of the Saxon garrison in Thorn following a nearly five-month-long siege.

In 1704, he was placed in command of a 1,250 strong dragoon regiment composed of men Dücker had himself recruited from Danzig and the surrounding area the previous year. Dücker and his regiment would go on to distinguish themselves at the Battle of Lemburg, being the first regiment to storm the town's fortifications, and at the Battle of Punitz, where they captured a Polish colonel.

In 1706, whilst Charles' main army was advancing on Grodno, Russian and Polish forces had managed to cut off Swedish lines of communication with Livonia. In response, Dücker was sent out with a small force of 900 dragoons in order to try and restore them. On 6 March, Dücker met up with a pro-Swedish Polish force and defeated a Coalition army at the Battle of Valkininkai. Following up on this victory, he then captured the city of Vilnius and seized a number of priceless valuables, ammunition and supplies left behind by the enemy. He also took part in the Battle of Kalisz.

During the Russian campaign, he led reconnaissance missions and participated in skirmishes and engagements against the Russians such as the battles of Oposhnya and Krasnokutsk–Gorodnoye. Following the defeat at the Battle of Poltava, Dücker fled with the remains of the Swedish army to the Dnieper and was amongst those who surrendered to the Russians at Perevolochna. However, after a short while in captivity, he was released in exchange for a colonel named Peter Lefort, who was being held prisoner by the Swedes.

=== Return to service ===
Once released, Dücker then travelled to the town of Rastenburg before making his way to the city of Stralsund. On 31 January 1710, he was appointed to major general. In late February, Dücker met up with General Magnus Stenbock at his headquarters in Scania and would go on to serve under him at the Battle of Helsingborg. For his actions at the battle, he was given command of the Västergötland Cavalry Regiment. Dücker was then promoted to lieutenant general and tasked with defending Swedish Pomerania from enemy incursions; However, despite initial successes, he was pushed back to Stralsund where he was then sieged down by a combined Russo-Danish army. After Stenbock relieved the city, he then placed Dücker in charge of his army's vanguard. During the Battle of Gadebusch, he was severely wounded in the neck by a musket ball, and had to be taken to Lübeck to have it removed.

Following his recovery, in February 1713, Dücker attempted to try and re-join Stenbock's army besieged in Tönning. He planned to sneak into the town by disguising himself, but this was abandoned. Dücker then returned to Stralsund where he resumed command of the city as well as all Swedish forces in Pomerania. In March, he was appointed general of the cavalry. In October, after Stralsund had once again come under siege and Stettin had been captured, Dücker received orders from the Royal Council urging him to withdraw his troops back to Sweden. Dücker, however, refused these orders, saying that he wouldn't leave unless he was commanded to the king. For the early part of 1714, Dücker then set about on building up Stralsund's defences; raising more troops and acquiring more funds, munitions and supplies. In May 1714, he managed to successfully incorporate two regiments from Holstein-Gottorp under Swedish command.

After Charles arrived at Stralsund following his exile in the Ottoman Empire, he assumed control of the city's defence and made Dücker his second-in-command. In 1715, despite the Swedes best efforts, they could prevent the Danes, Prussians and Russians from again besieging Stralsund, and Charles was soon convinced by Dücker and his other subordinates to return to Sweden. Dücker volunteered to remain in Stralsund and continued defending the city until December, when he was finally forced to surrender.

After being taken prisoner, Dücker was allowed to go to Hamburg on a word of honour so he could nurse his wounds. He stayed in Hamburg from 1716 to 1717 before travelling to London and then to Gothenburg, arriving there in January 1718. In April, Dücker took command of the army stationed in Strömstad and would serve under Charles during the invasion of Norway and the sieging of the Fredriksten fortress. Following Charles' death, Dücker took part in the decision to lift the siege and return to Sweden. Afterwards, Dücker, along with a few other generals, made a declaration that they would not swear an oath of homage until the royal election was held. Following the ascension of Ulrika Eleonora, they then swore the oath.

According to a myth, shortly after the king's death, Dücker is said to have written a letter to Charles Frederick, Duke of Holstein, urging him to make a claim for the throne and to abolish the absolute monarchy, and that he would have full backing from the military. However, due to grief from the king's death, the duke became indecisive and failed to make a decision on the matter, to which Dücker is supposed to have said: Well, if he cannot be a man, then he must be a woman. And now it is as good as too late. We lack no regent".

=== Entry into the Royal Council and final years of the war ===
In January 1719, Dücker was given the title of Count as well as a seat in the Royal Council. In June, he was Governor-General of Livonia. Dücker was also appointed to the rank of field marshal and given overall command of all Swedish forces. Whilst organising the defence of Sweden, he developed a close working relationship with Frederick, Prince of Hesse and would later support his ascension to the Swedish throne in 1720. On 13 August 1719, he was present during the Battle of Stäket, commanding the Stockholm army.

During his time in the council, he advocated for an alliance with Great Britain and proposed a plan to send troops to Finland for a joint attack on Livonia, which had now come under Russian occupation. In July 1719, he was involved in talks with John Carteret, the ambassador to Sweden, which concluded in a peace treaty between Sweden and Britain. However, due to a lack of British involvement, and a growing distrust towards Britain in Sweden, Dücker was not able to carry out his plan to for attack on Livonia. As a result, his reputation was partially damaged due to his association with this failed policy.

In April 1719, he became an assistant in the War College. Following the death of the War College's president Nils Gyllenstierna, a secret committee placed Dücker as head of the War College but did not grant him presidential powers, an arrangement that would last until his death. Dücker worked extensively in the organising and maintenance of the army as well as making sure it was fully armed.

== Later career ==
Following the end of the war, Dücker, as head of the War College, was tasked with organising Sweden's demobilisation. In May 1722, he was appointed chairman of a commission which investigated requests by officers returning from Russian POW camps who wanted their former commissions back, which had been refilled in their absence. He became chairman of the Defence Commission in August 1723, and later as chairman of the Commission on the Ordnance and the Fortifications.

In politics, Dücker aligned himself with the Holstein Party, which advocated for an alliance with Russia. In 1724, for his services in procuring an alliance between Sweden and Russia, he received a large sum of money by the Russian government and was given an estate in Livonia the following year. Dücker would continue to be a supporter of the Holstein Party until it was dissolved in 1727.

== Family ==
On 13 October 1707, he married 15-year-old Polish princess Theodora Zkozielska Oginska. The two met the previous year after Dücker found her in a convent where her father, Prince Bogislaw Oginski, who was fighting against the Swedes, had hid her along with her sisters and cousins. The couple had two children: Theodora Beata in 1712 and Carl Fredrik in 1714. Oginska died in Lübeck on 9 September 1719.

In 1720, Dücker married his second wife Countess Hedvig Wilhelmina Oxenstierna, daughter of Count Gustaf Adolf Oxenstierna. The two had no children.

The Dücker family lineage would become extinct on the male side following the death of Johan Henrik Valter Dücker in 1892.

Dücker died on 3 July 1732 in Stockholm. He is buried in Riddarholmen Church.

== See also ==
- List of Swedish field marshals
