= Battle of Valkininkai (1706) =

Engagement of the Great Northern War (1706)

- Part of the Great Northern War
Date	February 23, 1706 (O.S.); February 24, 1706 (Swedish calendar); March 6, 1706 (N.S.)
Location	Valkininkai, close to Vilnius, Lithuania 54°22′N 24°50′E
Result	Swedish victory

Belligerents
(Sweden) Swedish Empire; Pro-Leszczyński forces	Tsardom of Russia; Sandomierz Confederation

Commanders and leaders
(Sweden) Carl Gustaf Dücker (Polish–Lithuanian Commonwealth) Józef Potocki (Polish–Lithuanian Commonwealth) Jan Kazimierz Sapieha the Elder	(Russia) Christian Felix Bauer (Polish–Lithuanian Commonwealth) Michał Serwacy Wiśniowiecki (Polish–Lithuanian Commonwealth) Grzegorz Antoni Ogiński

Strength
1,000 Swedes; Several thousand Poles and Lithuanians	1,600 Russians; 3,000 Poles and Lithuanians

Casualties and losses
60 wounded, unknown number of killed	50 killed and 100 wounded Russians; 70 killed and 70 wounded Poles and Lithuanians

The Battle of Valkininkai took place at 6 March 1706 close to the town of Valkininkai in the Grand Duchy of Lithuania during the Great Northern War.

== History ==
A Swedish detachment of 1,000 dragoons sent out by Charles XII of Sweden from Grodno under Carl Gustaf Dücker sought to meet up with a larger Polish contingent under Józef Potocki and Jan Kazimierz Sapieha the Elder at Valkininkai, before marching towards Vilnius in order to secure the Swedish connection to Swedish Livonia which had been disturbed by Russian forces ever since the Battle of Gemauerthof. However, at the same time an allied force of about 4,600–7,000 Russians, Poles and Lithuanians under Christian Felix Bauer, Michał Serwacy Wiśniowiecki and Grzegorz Antoni Ogiński marched in their direction in order to beat the pro-Swedish Poles and Lithuanians before regrouping with their Swedish allies. The Swedish and Russian–Polish forces soon, rather unexpectedly, stumbled upon each other outside of the town where a fierce fight took place. The Swedes repulsed two attacks executed by their enemies, before withdrawing a distance away to some woods, in order to initiate a third attack prepared by the allied forces. Meanwhile, the battle was witnessed from a distance away by the Swedish–friendly Poles and Lithuanians who had yet to participate in the fighting. The Swedes soon, however, counterattacked on their own and managed to beat the allied forces from the field, after which the Poles and Lithuanians on the Swedish side decided the intervene and pursued the allies for a distance. The battle resulted in more than 60 wounded Swedes and up to 50 killed and 100 wounded Russians and another 70 killed and equally many wounded Poles and Lithuanians siding with the Russians. The Swedes soon arrived at Vilnius where they captured a large bulk of Russian supplies.
