= Jacques Duhan de Jandun =

Huguenot soldier and educator (1685–1746)

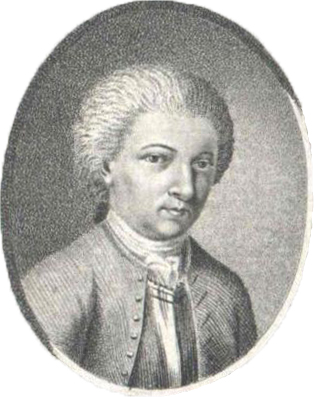
Jacques Duhan de Jandun

Jacques Egide Duhan de Jandun (14 March 1685 – 3 January 1746) was a Huguenot soldier who served for twelve years as tutor to Frederick the Great.

== Early life ==
Duhan's father was secretary to General Turenne before emigrating to Brandenburg in 1687. He educated Jacques himself while preparing him for a career as a soldier. The exceptional bravery of Duhan during the 1715 Siege of Stralsund caught the attention of Frederick William I, who was looking for a soldier rather than an academic to serve as civil tutor to his eldest son, the Crown Prince Frederick. Not knowing that Duhan was, in fact, a scholar well versed in ancient literature and modern philosophy, the King selected him as Frederick's tutor.

== Tutor to Crown Prince Frederick ==
Frederick William drew up an elaborate schedule for the Prince's education, cutting out studies of poetry, philosophy, and ancient history in favor of an increased concentration on religion and modern political history.

In spite of the king's orders, Duhan, over the twelve years of his service, continually scaled back the prince's religious education in favor of Greek, Roman, and French literature. He secretly secured for Frederick a private library of some three thousand volumes, housed at the Schlossfreiheit, and even went so far as to procure articles of French clothing for the young prince, items strictly forbidden by Frederick's francophobic father.

== Banishment ==
After Frederick's failed attempt to flee Prussia, Duhan's role in acquiring a private library for Frederick was discovered and, combined with Frederick William's general desire to punish anybody closely associated with the crown prince, this resulted in the banishment of Duhan. He was exiled to a tower in the Baltic Coast city of Memel, without pension. Frederick, while imprisoned at Küstrin, arranged through the Austrian ambassador General Seckendorff to have Austria pay a secret pension to Duhan. Then, after his release, Frederick secured Duhan a librarian position in Brunswick.

== Directorship of Liegnitz ==
Upon Frederick's becoming King of Prussia in 1740, Duhan was appointed director of the Liegnitz Academy in Silesia. Frederick outlined his duties: "to peacefully draw your salary, to love me, and to enjoy yourself." He continued his regular correspondence with Frederick throughout the Silesian Wars.

== Death ==
Frederick returned from victory in the Second Silesian War to news of Duhan's grave illness. The victorious king attended the death bed of his old tutor, and in early January 1746 Jacques Duhan died, attended by Frederick and various princes of Prussia. His sister was given a lifelong pension by Frederick in recognition of Duhan's long service.
