= Fisksätra =

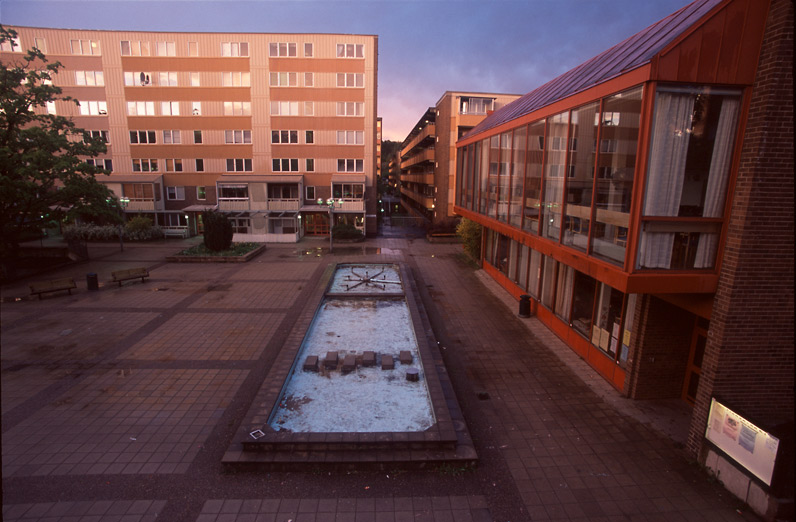
- Fisksätra Square in August 2004

- Location within Stockholm Location within Sweden Location within European Union
- Coordinates: 59°17′30″N 18°15′10″E
- Country: Sweden
- Province: Södermanland
- County: Stockholm County
- Municipality: Nacka Municipality

Area
  - Total: 1.03 km^{2} (0.40 sq mi)

Population (31 December 2020)
  - Total: 8,334
  - Density: 8,090/km^{2} (21,000/sq mi)
- Time zone: UTC+1 (CET)
  - Summer (DST): UTC+2 (CEST)

Fisksätra is a locality situated in Nacka Municipality, Stockholm County, Sweden with 7,475 inhabitants in 2010. Built in the 1970s during the Million programme, it has inhabitants of 70 different nationalities. 52% had a foreign background in 1997, rising to 62% in 2008. Fisksätra has a railway station along Saltsjöbanan.
