= Siege of Stralsund (1711–1715) =

Series of sieges in the Great Northern War

Coordinates: 54°18′N 13°5′E

- Part of the Great Northern War
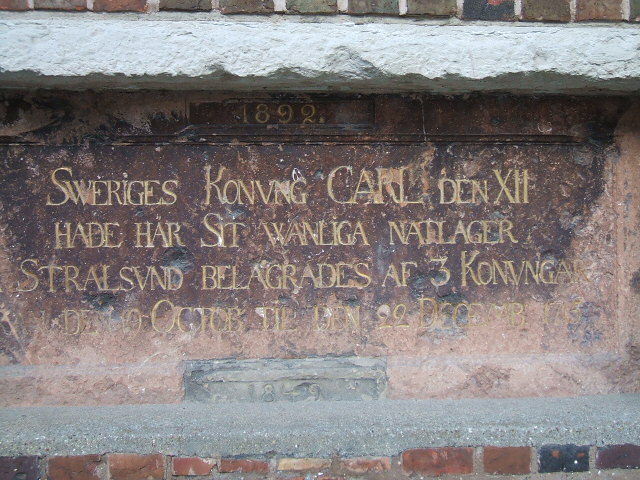
- Memorial plate commemorating the siege
Date	September 1711 – 24 December 1715
Location	Stralsund area, Swedish Pomerania (present-day Germany)
Result	Anti-Swedish coalition victory

Belligerents
Swedish Empire	Denmark-Norway; Saxony; Tsardom of Russia (1711–1714); Prussia (1714–1715)

Commanders and leaders
(Sweden) Charles XII (1714–1715) (Sweden) Magnus Stenbock (1711–1712) (Sweden) Carl Gustaf Dücker	(Denmark–Norway) Frederick IV (Russia) Aleksandr Danilovich Menshikov (1711–1714) (Note: Russian tsar Peter the Great had entrusted baron Aleksandr Danilovich Menshikov with the command of the sieges of Stralsund, Stettin and Tönning, yet in the first years of the campaign he was also present in Pomerania in person. Peter the Great left for Hanover and Russia in 1713, when Magnus Stenbock's defeat at Tönning became inevitable. Bushkovitch (2001), pp. 309-310.) (Kingdom of Prussia) Frederick William I (1714–1715) (Kingdom of Prussia) Alexander zu Dohna-Schlobitten (1714–1715)

Units involved
	Norwegian Infantry Regiment

Strength
11,500 (1715)	55,000–58,000 (1715)

Casualties and losses
Charles XII escaped. The whole garrison was captured.	Unknown

The siege of Stralsund was an armed engagement during the Great Northern War. The Swedish Empire defended her Swedish Pomeranian port of Stralsund against a coalition of Denmark-Norway, the Electorate of Saxony and the Tsardom of Russia, which was joined by the Kingdom of Prussia during the siege.

A first attempt to take Stralsund was made in 1711, when the allies closed in on the town. Swedish relief forced the coalition to withdraw from the fortifications, whereupon the besieging armies drew a wider ring along the lines of the Recknitz and Peene rivers. Magnus Stenbock's victory at Gadebusch for a short time distracted the allies, but after Stenbock's pursuit and subsequent defeat, Prussia as well as Hanover, ruled in personal union with Great Britain, joined the anti-Swedish alliance.

The allies agreed that Denmark should cede her claims to Bremen-Verden to Hanover, and in turn Denmark was promised the northern parts of Swedish Pomerania with Stralsund, while the southern parts were to become Prussian. In 1714, Charles XII of Sweden rode to Stralsund from his Turkish exile to lead the defense in person. From 12 July to 24 December 1715, the allies sieged the town and eventually forced its surrender. Charles XII escaped to Sweden.

Stralsund remained under Danish control until it was returned to Sweden by the Treaty of Frederiksborg.

== Prelude ==
In Poltava, the Swedish Empire lost the initiative in the Great Northern War. With Charles XII of Sweden's main army destroyed, the anti-Swedish alliance of the Tsardom of Russia, Denmark-Norway and Saxe-Poland-Lithuania re-constituted in the Treaty of Thorn and the Treaty of Copenhagen, the Swedish king exiled to Bender and Sweden's provinces of Finland and Livonia invaded, the Swedish defense relied on 11,800 soldiers garrisoned in northern Germany, and an army of 10,000 men in Greater Poland commanded by Ernst Detlof von Krassow. The latter was in full retreat, harassed by Saxon forces and a plague that had broken out in Poland.

The Swedish government issued mobilization orders for Swedish Pomerania on 8 April 1711. 3,800 men aged between twenty and forty years were to be drawn to serve a five years term. Stralsund had recovered from the destruction of 1678, but in 1711, the plague carried to Pomerania with the retreating Swedish forces of the Krassow corps caused thousands of deaths. The Swedes were pursued by the armies of the anti-Swedish coalition, who reached and laid siege to Stralsund in 1711.

This pursuit through formerly neutral Reich territory was made possible by the death of emperor Joseph I in April: until Joseph I's successor Charles VI was inaugurated, the imperial constitution ruled that August the Strong, one of the constituents of the anti-Swedish coalition, was in charge of northern Germany's imperial affairs. (Note: Per the constitution of the Holy Roman Empire, the empire was to be governed by two vicars during an interregnum. The vicar in charge of the north was to be the elector of Saxony, while the south would be governed by the Electorate of the Palatinate. Wilson (1998), p. 138.) Thus, when the Swedish forces withdrew to their fortified strongholds of Stralsund, Stettin (Szczecin) and Wismar, 6,000 Saxons, 6,000 Poles, and 12,000 Russians were able to follow up from the southeast. Another 25,000 Danes moved into the empire via Holstein-Gottorp, and approached Stralsund from the west.

== Siege ==
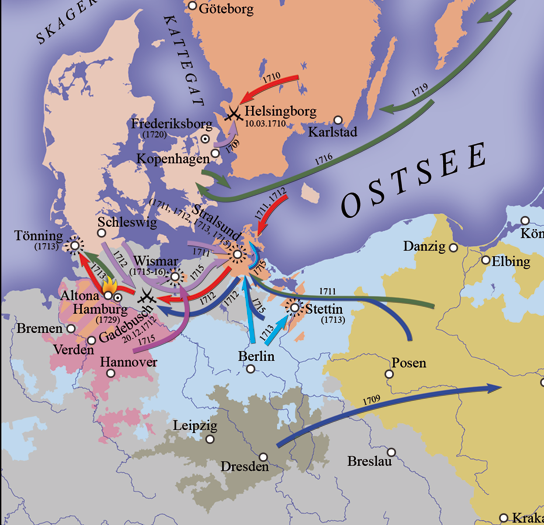
Great Northern War in Swedish Pomerania with Stralsund (center). Swedish Empire indicated in orange, Denmark in light ocre, Prussia in baby blue, Brunswick-Lüneburg (Hanover) in dark pink, Electorate of Saxony in olive, Poland-Lithuania in yellow. Russian campaign arrows are shown in green, Danish in purple, Saxon-Polish-Lithuanian in ultramarine, Swedish in red, Prussian in light blue, and Hanoveranian in dark pink. Besieged towns are indicated by a collar of black rays.

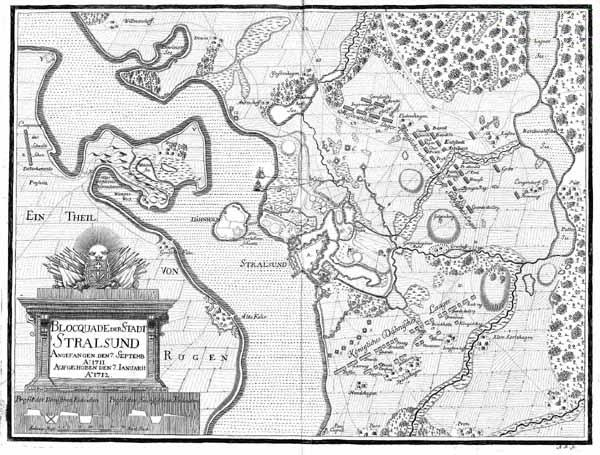
Map of the Stralsund area showing the position of the siege armies in 1711 and 1712. Note that the map is not oriented northwards.

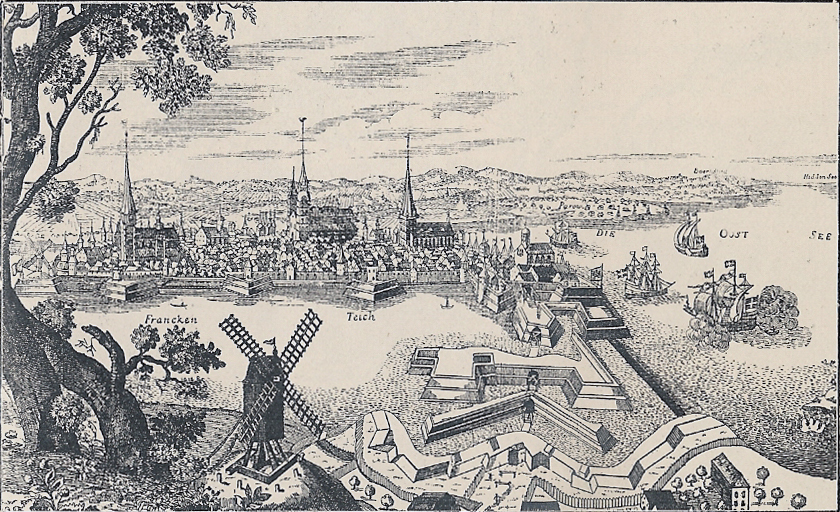
Stralsund in 1715

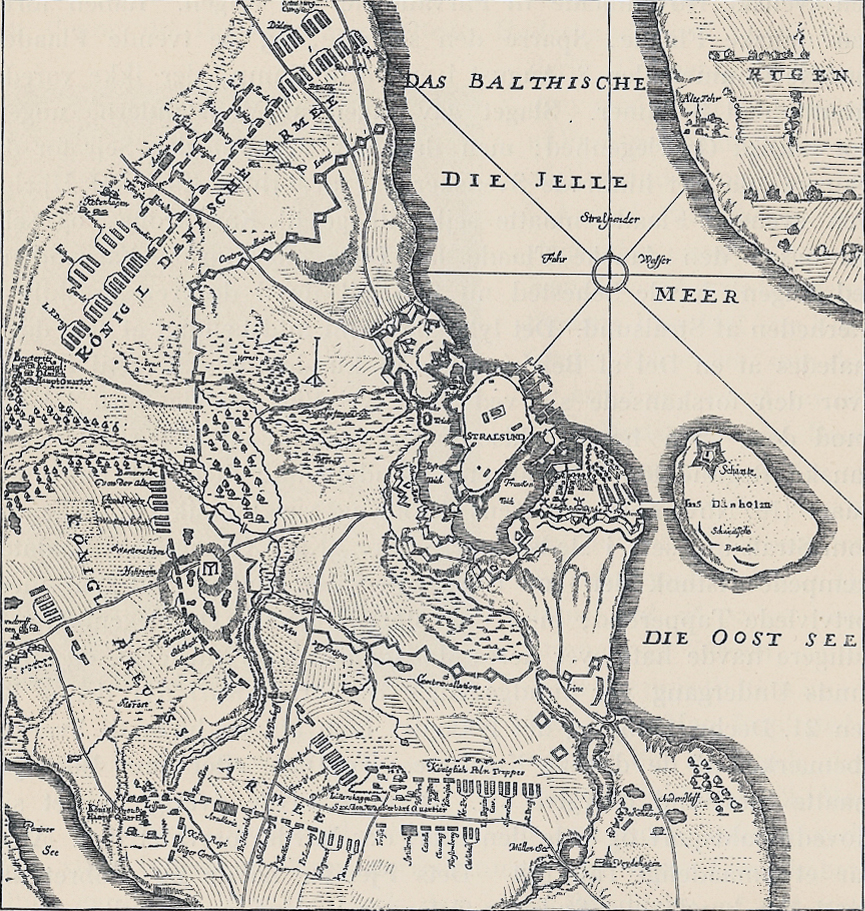
Map of Stralsund showing the siege army's positions in 1715

A Swedish relief force under Magnus Stenbock's command with a strength of 6,000 to 10,000 men landed on Rügen on 25 September 1711, whereupon the Danish-Saxon-Russian siege army withdrew to the Recknitz and Peene rivers. Instead of a launching another major assault on the town, the allies were content with minor raids and skirmishes into the pocket in the following years. Swedish general Carl Gustaf Dücker requested reinforcements, and in May 1712 was supplied with an additional 6,391 foot and 4,800 horse from Sweden. Also, Dücker concentrated all Swedish forces scattered in Pomeranian garrisons, another 8,000 men, in Stralsund, while the allied strength was about 23,000 men.

At this time, Frederik IV of Denmark-Norway was not interested in annexing Stralsund to his empire. When he re-entered the war in 1709, Frederik had promised to not attack Swedish territories in the Holy Roman Empire and protect their citizens wherever they pledge loyalty to him. Accordingly, Frederik IV had agreed in a convention of 1711 that Stralsund along with northern Swedish Pomerania should be annexed by August the Strong, elector of Saxony and king of Poland-Lithuania. However, after George I of Brunswick-Lüneburg (Hanover) ascended the throne of Great Britain, who had dropped out of the War of Spanish Succession in the Peace of Utrecht in 1713 and was thus free to enter the anti-Swedish alliance in the Great Northern War, Frederik IV changed his mind. Already in 1712, Denmark and Hanover had invaded and partitioned Bremen-Verden. (Note: Denmark had invaded Bremen-Verden claiming the neutrality of the Lower Saxon Circle was no longer in effect (see note above), and forced the Swedish garrison in Stade, 2,600 men, to surrender. Hanover had invaded Bremen-Verden claiming they would protect it for the Swedes from the plague carried by the Danes. Effectively, Bremen-Verden was thus partitioned with Denmark occupying the former archdiocese of Bremen, and Hanover occupying the Verden area. Wilson (1998), p. 139.)

The Stralsund area had been tied to Denmark in the Late Middle Ages, was of strategic importance as a bridgehead into the Holy Roman Empire, and a potent exporter of wool and grain. First Danish claims to northern Swedish Pomerania were formulated in 1713, and a respective treaty was drafted in May 1715 between Frederick IV and George I which guaranteed the Danish occupied Swedish dominion of Bremen-Verden to George I in return for him entering the war on Frederik's side, and Pomerania north of the Peene river as well as 30,000 talers to Frederik IV. When Prussia, keen to annex Swedish Pomerania as well, joined the allies in summer, a Dano-Prussian treaty was concluded partitioning Swedish Pomerania along the Peene, with Denmark being assured her claims for the northern part with Stralsund, and Prussia for the southern part with Stettin. August the Strong's protests and Danish tendencies to minimize their military efforts in the coalition after the treaty, resulting from Frederik IV's understanding that he now would gain Stralsund anyway, led to quarrels in the siege force.

Stenbock's forces turned west with 16,000 men to face the allies at Gadebusch, leaving 3,000 men to garrison Stralsund. Their victory and subsequent westward movement distracted the allies from the siege, yet when Stenbock burned down Danish Altona, Russian forces burned Swedish Pomeranian Wolgast east of Stralsund in revenge in 1713. The allies were free to concentrate on Stralsund again after Stenbock's forces, pursued by 36,000 Poles, Russians and Saxons, were defeated in the Battle of Tönning on 16 May 1713. Before re-joining with the siege army near Stralsund, Russian forces under Alexander Menshikov's command and a Saxon engineer corps were deployed from Tönning to Stettin, the second major Swedish fortress in Pomerania, and captured it on 29 September 1713. However, Russian tsar Peter the Great had to withdraw his forces from the Holy Roman Empire by the terms of the Treaty of Adrianople, concluded on 25 June 1713 as a consequence of the Pruth Campaign.

Charles XII of Sweden, exiled to Bender in the Ottoman Empire between the Surrender at Perevolochna and his return in 1714, had envisioned that Stralsund would constitute the base of a renewed Swedish attack on Peter the Great. Charles XII's plans foresaw a two-fold assault of a Swedish army from Pomerania and a Turkish army from the South. When Charles XII reached Stralsund in November 1714, the town's garrison was reinforced to a strength of 17,000 men. Searching for allies, Charles XII also negotiated with Prussia, but was unwilling to meet Frederick William I's demands on Stettin and 400,000 reichstalers in tribute. In April 1715, Königsberg declared war.

Though George I was not involved in the war as the king of Great Britain, but merely as the duke of Hanover, the Danish navy was assisted in the siege by eight British vessels, detached by British admiral John Norris, who was ordered to guard the Maritime Powers' merchants in the Baltic Sea. In July, the allied forces closed in on Stralsund from the landside, and in November a combined Danish-Saxon-Prussian army landed at Groß Stresow and took the island of Rügen north of the town. When defeat became inevitable, Charles XII escaped and the defenders surrendered on Christmas Eve. Stralsund became the capital of Danish Pomerania.

== Aftermath ==
After Stralsund's surrender, a Danish administration under commander von Stöcken was set up, and 1028 Swedish prisoners of war were detained in the town. Yet, many noble and burgher families - Pomeranian, Swedish or intermarried - remained loyal to Sweden. The Danish government reacted by prohibiting contacts to Sweden and obliging the landowners to pledge allegiance, otherwise, they would be stripped of their lands or expelled. As a consequence, an unknown number emigrated to Sweden, including Swedish prisoners of war who were able to escape with the help of the local population. Of sixty-nine high ranking Swedish officials and officers detained in Stralsund in January 1716, only thirty-one were still in town in March of the following year. When the local population continued to maintain close contacts with Sweden and aid Swedish refugees, Danish guards started to patrol the coast and investigate the traffic with Sweden, before this traffic was prohibited altogether until 1719. Since only a few nobles had pledged allegiance to Frederik IV in August 1716, the Danish government issued a deadline, and in October started to expropriate those who had not given the oath to the Danish king.

Also in 1716, Swedish Wismar surrendered to the allies, eliminating Sweden's last stronghold on the southern Baltic coast. By the end of the war however, Stralsund was restored to Sweden.

The siege of Stralsund marked the beginning of a friendship between Frederick William I of Prussia and Huguenot refugee Jacques Egide Duhan de Jandun, whom he first met when he was in the service of field marshal Alexander von Dohna in 1715. In the following year, Frederick William I entrusted Duhan den Jandun with the raising of his then four-year-old son, later known as Frederick the Great.

== Sources ==
=== Bibliography ===
- Bushkovitch, Paul (2001). Peter the Great. The struggle for power, 1671-1725. New studies in European history. Cambridge University Press. ISBN 0-521-80585-6.
- Grabinsky, Anne (2006). "Die Stralsunder Doppelkatastrophe von 1678/80: Wiederaufbau nach zwei vernichtenden Stadtbränden". Kleine Stadtgeschichte (in German). Vol. II. Berlin-Hamburg-Münster: LIT Verlag. ISBN 3-8258-8994-7.
- Kunisch, Johannes (2004). Friedrich der Grosse. Der König und seine Zeit (in German) (5 ed.). CH Beck. ISBN 3-406-52209-2.
- Meier, Martin (2008). Vorpommern nördlich der Peene unter dänischer Verwaltung 1715 bis 1721. Aufbau einer Verwaltung und Herrschaftssicherung in einem eroberten Gebiet. Beiträge zur Militär- und Kriegsgeschichte (in German). Vol. 65. Munich: Oldenbourg Wissenschaftsverlag. ISBN 978-3-486-58285-7.
- North, Michael (2008). Geschichte Mecklenburg-Vorpommerns. Beck Wissen (in German). Vol. 2608. CH Beck. ISBN 978-3-406-57767-3.
- Oakley, Steward (1992). War and peace in the Baltic, 1560-1790. War in Context. Abingdon - New York: Routledge. ISBN 0-415-02472-2.
- Wilson, Peter Hamish (1998). German armies. War and German politics, 1648-1806. Warfare and history. Routledge. ISBN 1-85728-106-3.
- Zapnik, Jörg (2006). "Pest in Stralsund während des Großen Nordischen Krieges 1710-1711 und das Historische Informationssystem". In Kroll, Stefan; Krüger, Kersten (eds.). Städtesystem und Urbanisierung im Ostseeraum in der Frühen Neuzeit: Urbane Lebensräume und historische Informationssysteme. Beiträge des wissenschaftlichen Kolloquiums in Rostock vom 15. und 16. November 2004. Geschichte / Forschung und Wissenschaft (in German). Vol. 12. Berlin-Hamburg-Münster: LIT. pp. 226–255. ISBN 3-8258-8778-2.
- Kling, Steve; Summerfield, Stephen (2015). Great Northern War Compendium: Frederick William I and Prussia's Involvement in the Great Northern War. Vol. 2. St. Louis: THGC Publishing. ISBN 978-0-9964557-3-2.
- Poetzsch, Johnny (2018). Phoenix –Den återuppståndne. Försvaret av Stralsund och de svenska provinserna i Nordtyskland 1710-1716 (in Swedish). Falun: Poetzsch historica. ISBN 978-91-984484-0-5.
