= Nacka Municipality =

Nacka Municipality Nacka kommun
- Municipality
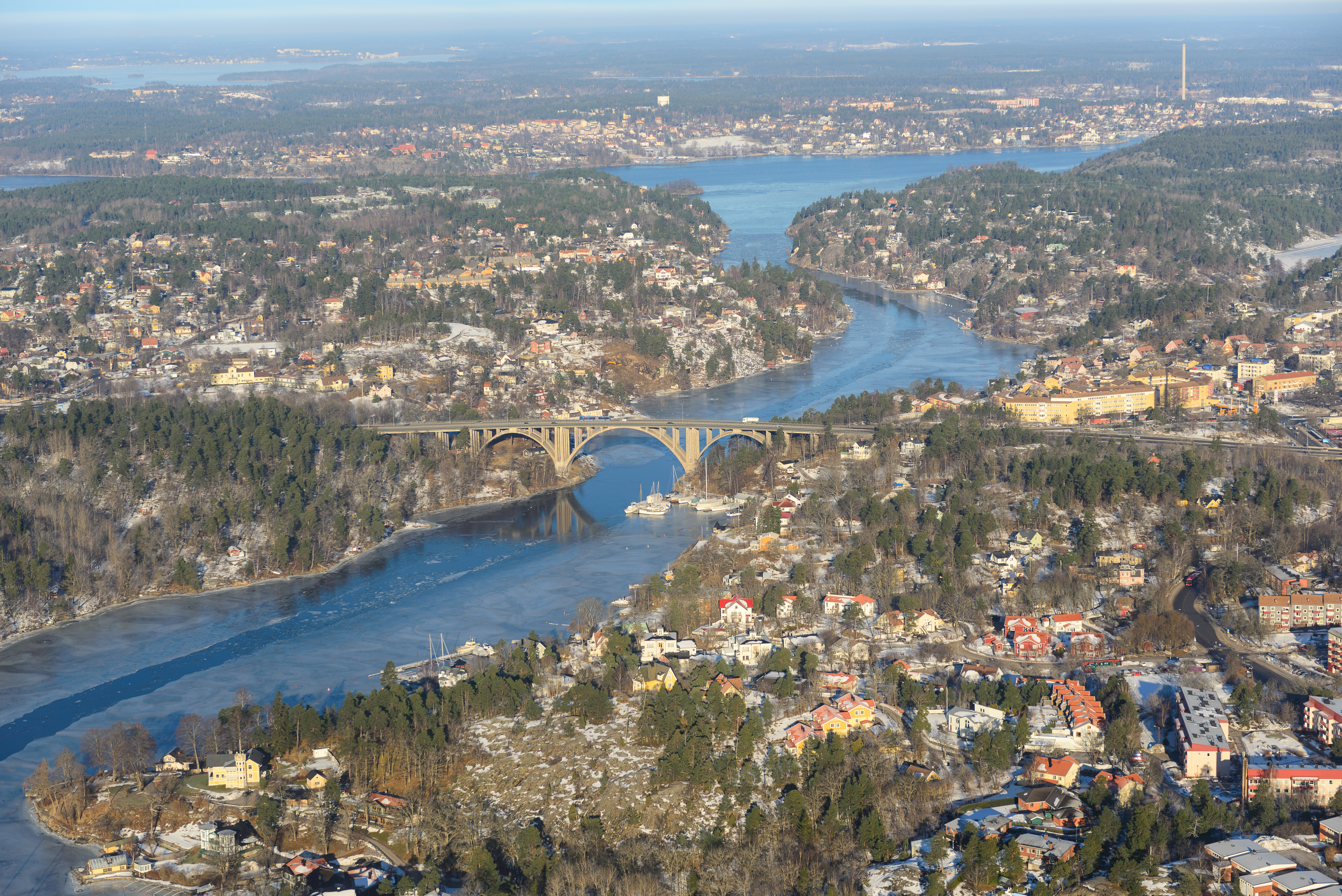
- A view of Nacka Municipality

- Coat of arms

- Coordinates: 59°19′N 18°10′E
- Country: Sweden
- County: Stockholm County
- Seat: Nacka

Area
  - Total: 128.83 km^{2} (49.74 sq mi)
  - Land: 95.12 km^{2} (36.73 sq mi)
  - Water: 33.71 km^{2} (13.02 sq mi)
- Area as of 1 January 2014.

Population (30 June 2025)
  - Total: 113,328
  - Density: 1,191/km^{2} (3,086/sq mi)
- Demonyms: Nackan
- Time zone: UTC+1 (CET)
  - Summer (DST): UTC+2 (CEST)
- ISO 3166 code: SE
- Province: Uppland and Södermanland
- Municipal code: 0182
- Website: www.nacka.se
- Density is calculated using land area only.

Nacka Municipality (Swedish: Nacka kommun) is a municipality in Stockholm County in east-central Sweden. Its seat is located at Nacka. The municipality is situated just east of the Swedish capital, Stockholm, and its western parts are considered a suburban part of the city of Stockholm.

The present municipality was created in 1971 when the City of Nacka (itself instituted in 1949) was amalgamated with Saltsjöbaden (itself detached from "old" Nacka in 1909) and Boo.

== Geography ==
The municipality is situated in two historical provinces (landskap), Uppland and Södermanland, but in one administrative county (län), Stockholm County.

The western densely built-up area of Nacka Municipality is a contiguous part of the city of Stockholm. About 50,000 of the municipality's total population live there.

There are also some more localities in the municipality. The largest ones are Boo, Fisksätra, Saltsjöbaden, Skuru and Älta.

== History ==
The area has been populated since the first mountaintops emerged as islands from the sea after the end of the Last Ice Age, during the Mesolithic. During the Viking Age (800 – 1100 AD), the area has been estimated to have been populated by 100 people. They lived by farming and fishing.

A Danish sailing description from the late 13th century describes the area as a transportation region. The water roads were easier to use than the land roads and were also the main route to the capital, Stockholm. Those circumstances cause plenty of restaurants to be along the shores to cater to travellers. An article by Gunnar Ahlberg describes 24 different outlets and their busy service. In the 18th century, the restaurants closer to the city were transformed from shabby small places to more sophisticated establishments. Here came not only travelers but also citizens of Stockholm for a summer excursion. Many of the artists of the times have documented the excursions in drawings and songs.

During the wintertime, the waterways change somewhatm and instead of taking the seaway, travellers crossed the many lakes with sleighs to reach Stockholm.

The municipality's name harks back to a 16th-century industrial operation established by the Crown at Nacka farmstead where conditions for water mills are good. That spot is now, however, not densely populated, and the municipal seat is on land that once belonged to Järla farmstead on the other side of Lake Järla.

One of many battles during the Great Northern War took place in the most eastern part of Nacka. In 1719, Russian forces burned and raided the eastern coast of Sweden. Several cities were attacked and almost all buildings in the archipelago of Stockholm were burned. On their way to Stockholm greatly outnumbered Swedish forces managed to fight off the attacking Russians at the battle of Stäket.

=== 20th century ===
The municipality has had a continuous population increase since the 1960s and has almost doubled its population. Today it is the third most populous municipality in Stockholm County, after Stockholm Municipality and Huddinge Municipality, and the 20th in Sweden. The massive increase in housing supply has caused the population to be predicted to grow at an annual rate of more the 3% by the year 2020.

Nacka became the location of an experiment in psychiatry in the 1970s, initiated by psychiatrist Bengt Bengtsson. It allowed the inhabitants a local access to psychotherapeutic methods for preventive purposes. The role model was the Community Mental Health system developed in the U.S. The system has since been implemented in other municipalities.

The industry in Nacka is mainly of a service nature. Nacka has an extensive commuting traffic to Stockholm City, and few major companies are located in Nacka itself.

Nacka is being integrated into the Stockholm Metro via the Blue Line extension. Construction began in 2020 and is expected to be completed by 2030. The extension includes three new stations in the municipality, Sickla, Järla and a new terminus station, Nacka (located near the Nacka Forum shopping center).

== Nature ==
Nacka has (in 2015) 12 nature reserves, and two large recreational nature areas, all with a varied landscape of pine forests, swamps and lakes. The largest nature reserve is Nackareservatet, with an area of approximately 730 hectare.

== Demographics ==
=== Population development ===
Nacka is a municipality whose population has continuously grown over the last 65 years and had by 2017 passed 100 000 citizens.

Population development in Nacka Municipality 1970–2019
Year	Population
1970	48,035
1975	55,321
1980	57,229
1985	59,688
1990	64,056
1995	70,172
2000	74,974
2005	80,247
2010	90,108
2015	97,986
2017	101,231
2019	105,189

=== 2022 population by district ===
This is a demographic table based on Nacka Municipality's electoral districts in the 2022 Swedish general election sourced from SVT's election platform, in turn taken from SCB official statistics.

In total there were 77,440 Swedish citizens of voting age resident in the municipality. 48.4% voted for the left coalition and 50.3% for the right coalition. Indicators are in percentage points except population totals and income.

Location	Residents	Citizen adults	Left vote	Right vote	Employed	Swedish parents	Foreign heritage	Income SEK	Degree
Location			%	%					
Alphyddan, Finntorp V	1,449	1,198	60.6	38.0	77	70	30	25,213	70
Björknäs S	2,137	1,487	48.6	50.3	84	71	29	29,834	50
Danviken, Saltsjöqvarn	1,983	1,736	50.1	49.1	81	83	17	37,870	71
Duvnäs Utskog	1,628	1,133	52.5	47.1	87	88	12	42,341	70
Eknäs V, Tollare V	1,815	1,167	47.2	51.4	84	76	24	34,045	59
Eknäs Ö, Hjortängen	2,225	1,484	41.2	57.8	87	85	15	42,258	68
Ektorp	1,979	1,437	53.8	44.6	74	69	31	23,695	62
Ekängen, Saltängen V	1,946	1,404	46.7	52.6	85	85	15	36,680	71
Finnberget, Kvarnholmen	1,285	1,020	50.0	49.2	82	71	29	33,364	65
Finnboda	1,846	1,377	50.7	48.2	87	79	21	41,054	70
Finntorp Ö	2,255	1,861	56.6	41.7	81	74	26	28,818	59
Fisksätra N	1,994	1,166	68.0	26.7	68	18	82	19,042	33
Fisksätra S	1,827	1,232	56.1	40.1	70	39	61	23,356	37
Fisksätra V	2,175	1,367	63.3	31.4	69	30	70	21,655	39
Fisksätra Ö	1,866	1,085	68.3	23.2	68	20	80	18,984	33
Gustavsvik, Insjön	1,966	1,342	42.3	57.3	84	83	17	37,373	58
Hasseludden	1,967	1,360	41.1	58.0	84	83	17	40,340	62
Hedvigslund	1,828	1,218	51.0	48.0	86	82	18	36,385	60
Henriksdal	1,709	1,240	64.5	33.4	73	54	46	24,976	54
Igelboda, Neglinge S	1,785	1,263	32.0	66.8	84	90	10	41,388	77
Igelbodaplatån	1,739	1,405	43.7	55.0	79	72	28	26,256	54
Jarlaberg N	1,539	1,213	57.4	41.2	82	68	32	29,540	62
Jarlaberg S	1,469	1,043	52.6	45.6	81	64	36	30,884	55
Järla, Nya gatan	1,020	985	51.2	47.6	86	76	24	33,192	64
Järla sjö	2,127	1,557	55.5	43.4	88	83	17	40,491	74
Kolarängen	1,950	1,403	48.9	50.4	86	86	14	41,634	68
Krokhöjden	2,112	1,629	53.0	45.5	83	75	25	27,838	44
Kvarnholmen Ö	1,969	1,493	40.4	58.3	87	78	22	42,293	67
Källvägsområdet	2,549	1,721	40.2	58.5	87	84	16	40,907	62
Lilla Björknäs	2,272	1,615	41.7	57.8	86	83	17	38,888	64
Lillängen, Storängen	1,610	1,211	50.0	49.7	82	87	13	40,917	77
Lännersta N	2,488	1,653	40.5	59.0	87	88	12	42,781	67
Lännersta S	1,986	1,275	41.1	58.4	86	87	13	44,874	69
Mensättra, Eriksvik	2,111	1,351	41.8	56.9	86	81	19	38,694	58
Nacka C	1,912	1,626	50.9	47.5	79	56	44	27,240	53
Nacka strand	1,851	1,419	40.5	58.5	87	75	25	39,967	67
Nysätra, Hästhagen	2,117	1,642	57.5	41.6	84	82	18	34,347	70
Orminge C	1,352	1,125	51.4	47.0	78	53	47	25,521	43
Orminge N	1,918	1,220	57.6	40.8	78	51	49	22,771	35
Orminge S	1,685	1,175	62.0	35.5	78	59	41	23,456	35
Orminge Ö	2,193	1,547	56.9	42.2	88	84	16	34,740	55
Rösunda	1,893	1,540	26.7	72.6	78	86	14	36,610	68
Saltsjö-Duvnäs	2,044	1,535	41.7	57.4	82	87	13	39,039	76
Sickla V	1,256	992	56.1	43.0	85	82	18	37,977	76
Sickla Ö, Tallbacken	1,605	1,249	66.3	32.7	85	79	21	31,525	69
Sigfridsborg	2,102	1,394	54.8	44.4	89	86	14	39,473	70
Skogalund	2,185	1,594	50.0	49.0	81	73	27	30,567	56
Skogsö, Baggensudden	1,804	1,408	34.3	64.4	79	85	15	37,571	70
Skuru	1,915	1,319	45.5	54.1	86	86	14	43,988	72
Solsidan S, Älgö	2,036	1,379	21.6	77.5	75	83	17	42,412	74
Stensö N	1,763	1,273	58.5	40.2	78	56	44	24,171	43
Stensö S	1,747	1,130	55.9	41.0	75	46	54	23,782	37
Tattby, Solsidan N	1,557	1,107	29.6	69.5	82	89	11	47,106	79
Tollare Ö	2,127	1,426	41.5	58.0	91	80	20	39,747	63
Vikingshill	2,736	1,860	47.9	51.4	84	85	15	36,766	61
Älta gård	2,046	1,439	53.4	46.1	88	86	14	38,121	68
Ältadalen, S Hedvigslund	1,601	910	54.4	45.0	94	87	13	42,518	73
Source: SVT

=== Income and Education ===
The population in Nacka Municipality has the 5th highest median income per capita in Sweden. The share of highly educated persons, according to Statistics Sweden's definition: persons with post-secondary education that is three years or longer, is 39.0% and the 10th highest in the country.

=== Residents with a foreign background ===
On 31 December 2017 the number of people with a foreign background (persons born outside of Sweden or with two parents born outside of Sweden) was 25 681, or 25.37% of the population (101 231 on 31 December 2017). On 31 December 2002 the number of residents with a foreign background was (per the same definition) 16 281, or 21.25% of the population (76 624 on 31 December 2002). On 31 December 2017 there were 101 231 residents in Nacka, of which 19 717 people (19.48%) were born in a country other than Sweden. Divided by country in the table below - the Nordic countries as well as the 12 most common countries of birth outside of Sweden for Swedish residents have been included, with other countries of birth bundled together by continent by Statistics Sweden.

Country of birth
31 December 2017
1	Sweden	81,514
2	European Union: Other countries	3,199
3	Asia: Other countries	2,411
4	Finland	2,271
5	South America	1,429
6	Poland	1,396
7	Africa: Other countries	1,371
8	Europe outside of the EU: other countries	988
9	Iraq	706
10	Iran	670
11	North America	662
12	Afghanistan	657
13	Syria	651
14	Germany	528
15	Thailand	428
16	Eritrea	401
17	Turkey	329
18	Norway	322
19	Yugoslavia/Yugoslavia; SFR Yugoslavia/Serbia and Montenegro	301
20	Somalia	263
21	Denmark	218
22	Bosnia and Herzegovina	180
23	Soviet Union	148
24	Oceania	132
25	Iceland	40
26	Unknown country of birth	16

== Sports ==
The following sports clubs are located in Nacka:

- Järla IF FK

== Points of interests ==
- Nackasändaren Radio Mast

== Notable people ==
- Magdalena Andersson - politician, leader of the Social Democratic Party
- Thomas Bodström - lawyer, writer, former politician and Minister for Justice
- Karin Dreijer - singer, songwriter, record producer
- Olof Dreijer - DJ, record producer
- Nicolao Dumitru - football player
- Christer Gardell - venture capitalist
- Nicklas Grossmann - NHL hockey player
- Carola Häggkvist - singer, songwriter
- Sebastian Ingrosso - DJ/Producer of House
- Cornelia Jakobs - Eurovision 2022 Participant, singer
- Jessica Landstrom - football player
- Ulf Lundell - musician, songwriter, author
- Annie Lööf - politician, leader of the Centre Party
- Markoolio - recording artist, television show host, actor
- Nova Miller - recording artist, dancer, actor
- Mona Sahlin - politician, former leader of the Social Democratic Party
- Those Dancing Days - Indie pop band
- Edvin Ryding - actor

== Twin towns — sister cities ==
The municipality is twinned with:

- Keila, Estonia
- Pyhtää, Finland
- Jelgava, Latvia
- Gliwice, Poland
- Greenwich, Connecticut, United States
- Santa Rosa del Peñón, Nicaragua
- Adalar, Turkey

== Gallery ==
The images give a view of how the geography looks, with some hills and some tall houses, and streets.

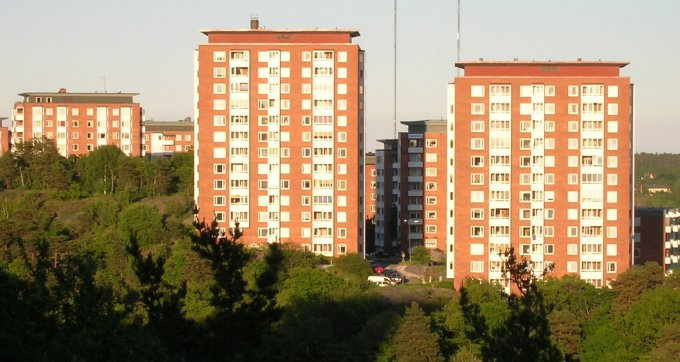
Alphyddan

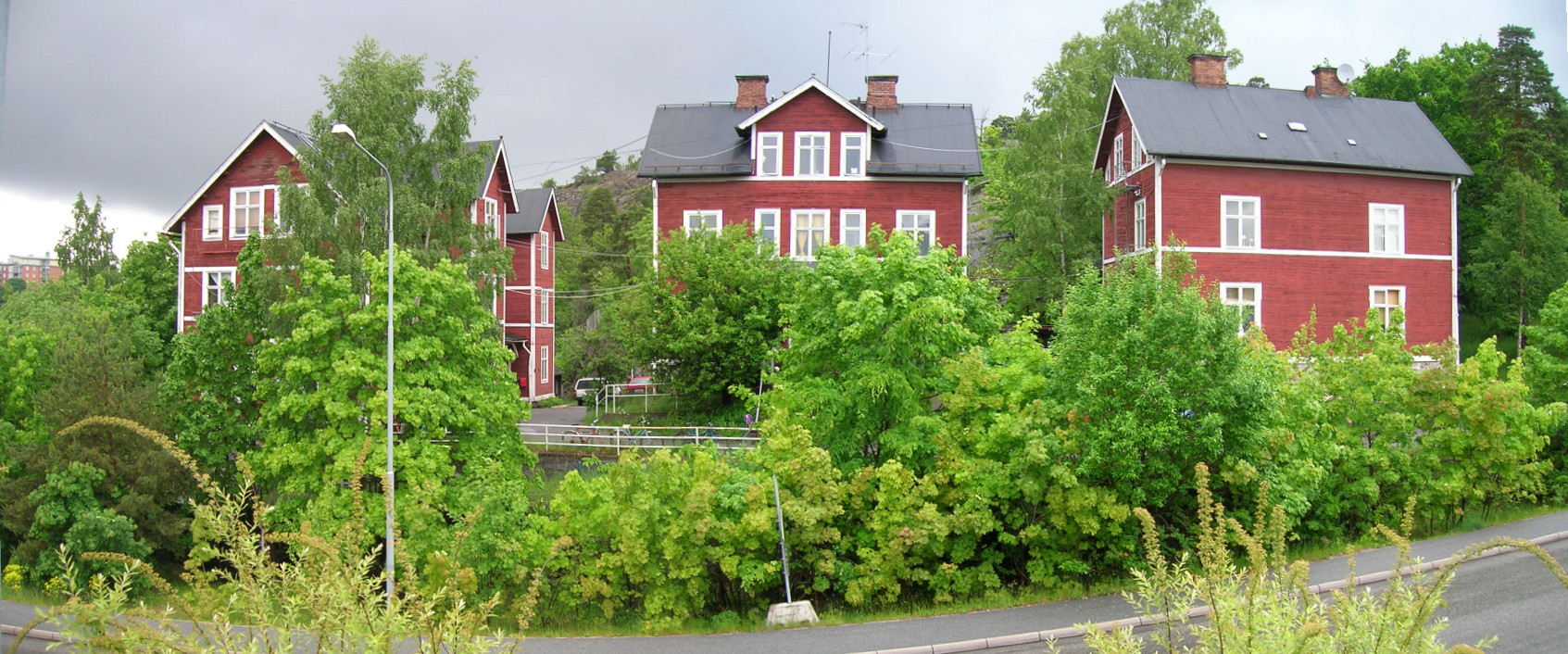
Gäddviken

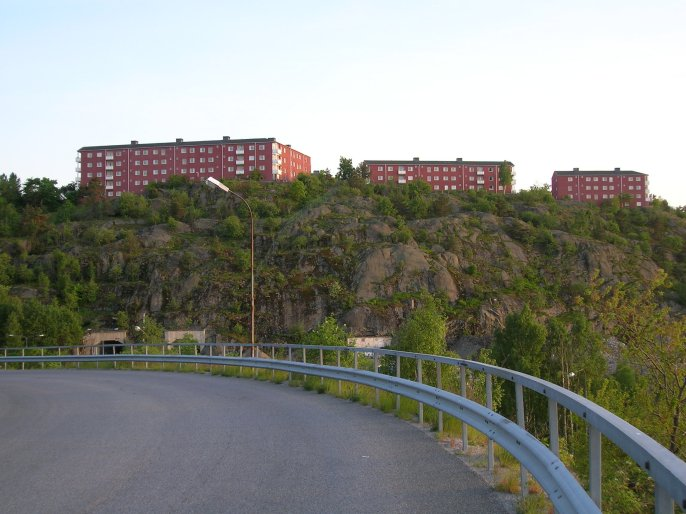
Finnberget

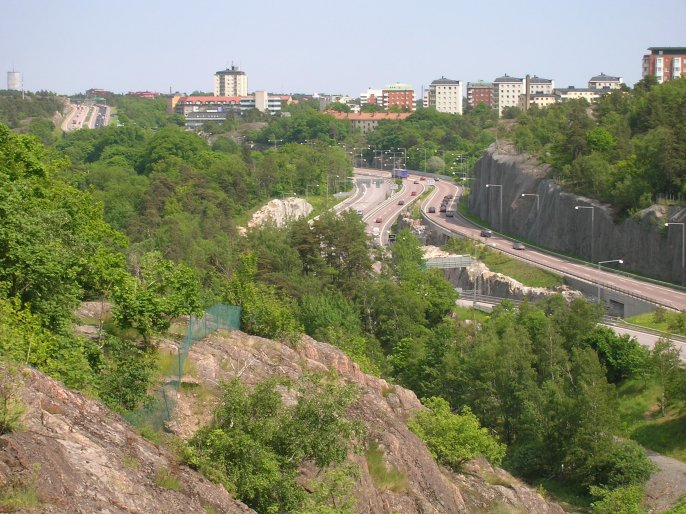
Värmdöleden at Alphyddan

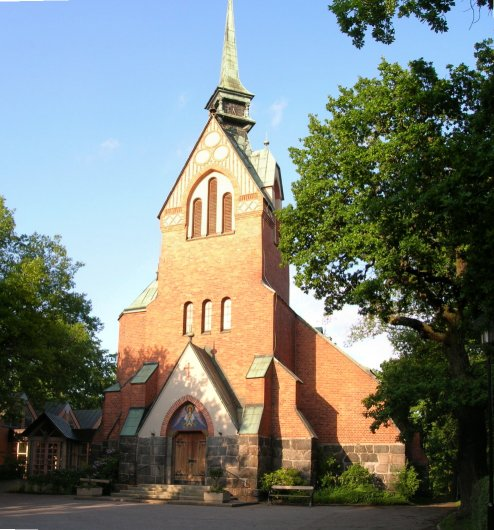
Nacka church, built in 1891

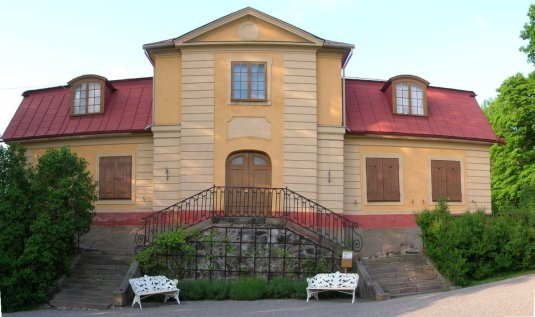
Svindersvik, a summer estate built in 1740
