= Battle of Gadebusch =

1712 battle of the Great Northern War

Coordinates: 53°40′18″N 11°06′43″E

- Part of the Great Northern War
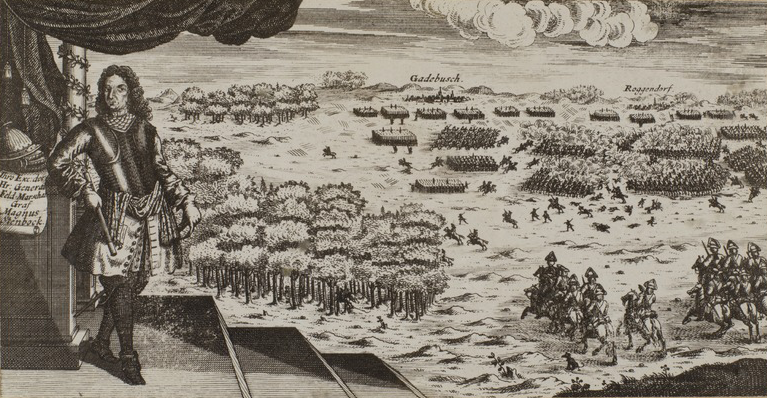
- Magnus Stenbock at Gadebusch, unknown author
Date	9 December 1712 (O.S.); 20 December 1712 (N.S.)
Location	Wakenstädt near Gadebusch, 35 km south of Lübeck in present-day Germany
Result	Swedish victory

Belligerents
(Sweden) Swedish Empire	Denmark–Norway; Electorate of Saxony

Commanders and leaders
(Sweden) Magnus Stenbock	(Denmark–Norway) Frederick IV (Denmark–Norway) Jobst von Scholten (Electorate of Saxony) Jacob Heinrich von Flemming

Strength
12,500:^{[a]} 6,500 foot, 6,000 horse, 20 or 30 cannon	17,000:^{[b]} 8,300 Danish foot, 4,900 Danish horse, 3,800 Saxon horse, 14 cannon

Casualties and losses
1,600:^{[c]} 550 killed, 1,022 wounded	6,500:^{[d]} 2,500 killed, 4,000 captured (of which 1,500 were wounded)
- Notes: ^[a] The Swedes had 19 battalions and 54 (or 58) squadrons with an effective fighting force of between 12,000 and 14,000 men (6,000 being cavalry) and 20 or 30 cannons. Reportedly, the Swedish army counted 10,600 men after the battle, which, if the artillery crew of 300 men and the 1,600 losses is applied, presents a figure of 12,500 men.; ^[b] The Danes had 19 (or 18) battalions and 46 (or 48) squadrons with an effective fighting force of between 13,200 and 16,000 men (about 5,000 being cavalry) and 14 cannons. The Saxons had 32 squadrons (some sources mentions 2 battalions as well) with between 3,000 and 3,800 men. In total, the Danes and Saxons had 19 battalions and 78 squadrons with between 17,000 and 20,000 men.; ^[c] The Swedish losses were 29 officers killed, 62 officers wounded with between 491 and 521 commons killed and between 895 and 960 wounded. The higher number is regarded the more reliable one.; ^[d] The Danes and Saxons had sustained over 2,000 or possibly 3,000 men killed in the battle. Up to 4,000 or 4,500 had been captured (about 1,700 took Swedish service after the battle) of which a third, or about 1,500 men, were wounded. The number of wounded who slipped away in the retreat is unknown. Furthermore, 13 cannons, 2 drums and 13 standards and banners were lost to the Swedes.

The Battle of Gadebusch or Wakenstädt (20 December 1712) was Sweden's final great victory in the Great Northern War. It was fought by the Swedes to prevent the loss of the city of Stralsund to Danish and Saxon forces.

== Prelude ==
During 1712, all of Sweden's dominions south of the Baltic Sea, apart from forts, had been conquered by the allies Denmark, Saxony, and Russia. In the Baltic the Danish admiral Gyldenløve patrolled with a squadron to disrupt Swedish supply lines to the Continent. It was vital for Sweden not to lose Stralsund, as it was the gateway to campaigns in Poland.

While a Danish army moved in the region of Hamburg, a large Russian-Saxon force stood south of Stralsund. Stenbock could hardly attack this force with a frontal assault, but hoped that by moving west towards Mecklenburg it could be encircled or scattered. Such a movement would also prevent the joining of the two allied forces. The Danish army under Frederick IV of Denmark was led by general Jobst von Scholten closer to the Russian-Saxon army, and on 3 December the Danish forces reached the little town of Gadebusch, southwest of Wismar. The allied movements were slowed due to disagreements among the allied commanders. On 8 December he marched the Swedish army to Gross Brütz less than ten kilometers east of Gadebusch. Now the Russian infantry was too far away to assist the Danes, but the Saxon cavalry under Jacob Heinrich von Flemming was approaching quickly.

That night the Danish forces broke camp and moved to a better position around the village of Wakenstädt, three kilometers south of and today incorporated by Gadebusch. Scholten expected the Swedish attack to come from the south to avoid the marshy Radegast river. At four in the morning of 9 December the Danish army was arrayed in defensive formation, with cavalry wings flanking the infantry in the center. As hours passed, snowfall turned to rain. Finally, the Saxon cavalry under Flemming arrived at Wakenstädt at mid-morning.

Swedish reconnaissance made it clear that the only Swedish option was a frontal assault. Stenbock judged that although the passable terrain was narrow and his men somewhat outnumbered, the thirty Swedish field guns would provide an advantage over the Danish thirteen.

== Battle ==
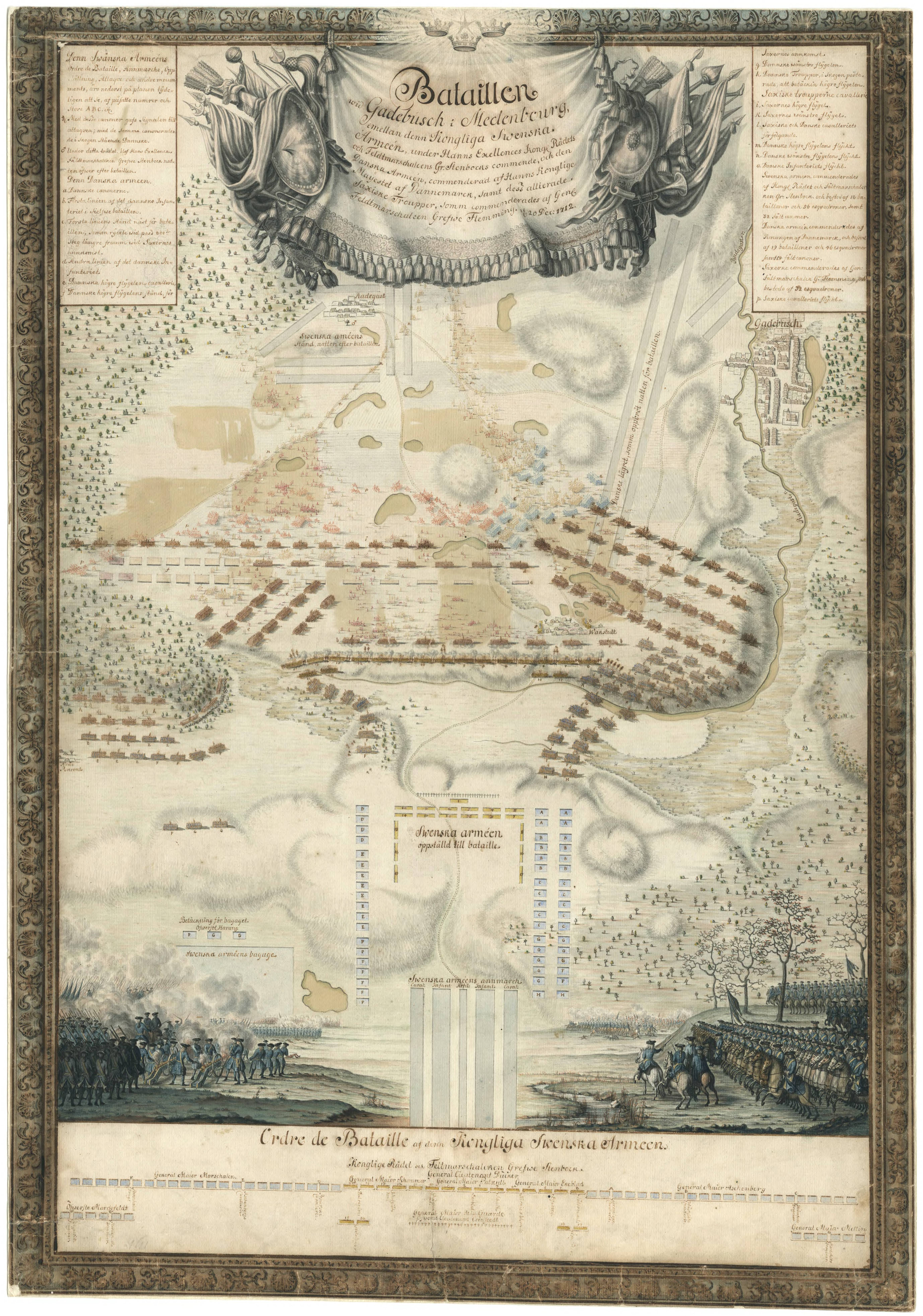
Map of the battle

The Swedish onslaught from the east began around 11 a.m. Swedish artillery opened fire on the tightly grouped Danish battalions and provided cover for the deploying cavalry and infantry.

At 1 p.m. the order to attack was given. While the artillery kept firing, the infantry marched towards the Danes, not firing until reaching a distance of twelve paces. During this time, the Danish opponent remained relatively passive although firing several long range volleys with little effect. A Danish cavalry counterattack was broken by the infantry, supported by the constant artillery fire.

To the north, the Swedish cavalry made a flanking movement and surprised the Danish cavalry on the Danish left wing. The subsequent retreat into Wakenstädt caused confusion in the Danish ranks, which was exploited by the infantry on the Swedish right wing. Meanwhile, heavy fighting was taking place on the Danish right wing where the elite of the Danish army, the royal guard, was positioned supported by the main bulk of the Saxon cavalry. But despite the numerical superiority of the allies, attacks by the Saxon cavalry were repelled. The two Danish guard regiments fought a hard pressed melee battle with the Swedish Dalarna Regiment and Hälsinge Regiment. The fight was eventually won by the Swedes when the Danes realized that cavalry support would not come (the cavalry was engaged with the Swedish cavalry during the whole fight) while they were slowly pushed back by the Swedish infantry onslaught. Eventually the order for retreat came and the guard regiments withdrew in quite good order but with big losses, the Swedes were tired and had also taken considerable losses from the battle and could not make any determined pursuits.

The battle wound down by dusk: Danish and Saxon forces withdrew more or less orderly to a position several kilometers west of Gadebusch to regroup. All of the Danish artillery had been abandoned.

== Aftermath ==
After the battle Stenbock was promoted to Field Marshal by an approving King Charles. The battle was won by efficient use of artillery combined with determined flanking attacks by infantry and cavalry, and it gave the hard-pressed Swedish forces some well needed breathing room.

Stenbock who had earlier fought in the Nine Years' War, later pronounced:
"Never have I seen such a combination of uncontrollable dash and perfectly controlled discipline; such soldiers and such subjects are not to be found the wide world over except in Sweden." Referring to his Swedish troops that fought in the battle. Even from the other side, Maurice de Saxe claimed that the Swedish bravery at Gadebusch was absolutely astounding.

Strategically, however, there was little impact, and the allies with their overwhelming numerical superiority would surround and defeat Stenbock's forces after a siege in the fortress of Tönningen the next year.
