= Baggensstäket =

Strait in the Stockholm archipelago, within Sweden

Coordinates: 59°18′02″N 18°16′37″E

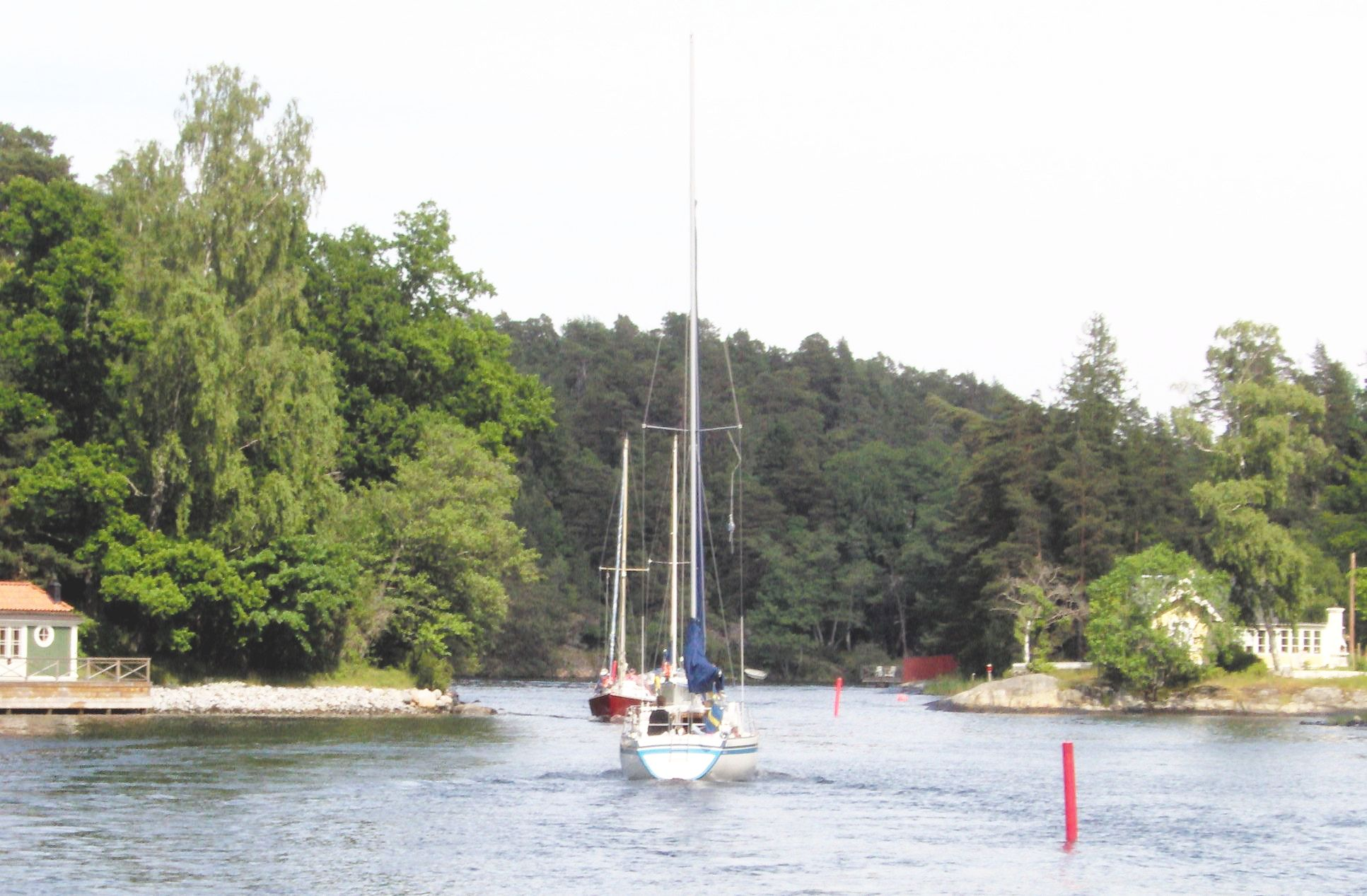
The entrance to Baggensstäket from Stockholm, 2005

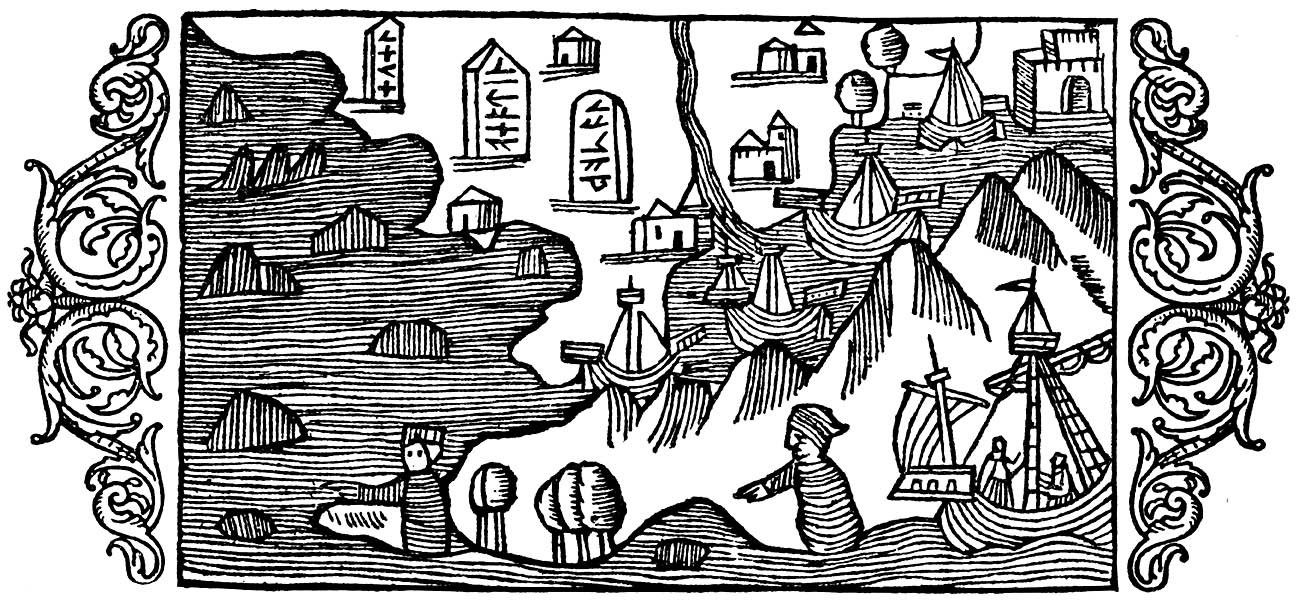
The archipelago with Baggensstäket rendered by Olaus Magnus in 1555

Baggensstäket (also Baggarstäket or Södra stäket) is a strait in the Stockholm archipelago, between the island of Värmdö and the mainland (Södermanland).

It is part of the waterway between the firth of Baggensfjärden and bay of Lännerstasundet. The waterway continues northwards through Skurusundet to Stockholm.

The strait is shallow and narrow and can only be traversed by small vessels with up to 3 m (9.8 ft) draft. Traffic through the strait is heavy in summertime.

== Etymology ==
Baggenstäket, like the nearby firth Baggensfjärden, probably was given its name after the naval hero Jakob Bagge, who owned the nearby estate Boo gård on Värmdö.

== History ==
Baggensstäket, which was known as Harstäket earlier, was since time immemorial the southern waterway between Stockholm and the Baltic Sea. Until the 13th century the main waterway led through Baggensstäket, Lännerstaviken, and Järlasjön to Hammarbysjön; later it passed Lännerstaviken och Skurusundet. Baggensstäket was the main waterway to Stockholm until the end of the Middle Ages, when the post-glacial rebound made the channel shallower while at the same time ships progressively had larger drafts. It is also probable that the waterway was made more impassable by filling it with rubble. Such filling with rubble may have been done during conflicts between 1518 and 1520. After the Swedish War of Liberation, king Gustav Vasa ordered a clearing of the waterway.

Eric XIV decreed that all ships from foreign countries were to be inspected in Vaxholm and pay toll fees for goods transported to Stockholm. In response, some merchants transferred their cargoes to smaller vessels which were passed in via Baggensstäket, which in this manner became a well-utilized smuggling route. Charles IX decreed in 1602 that a toll station would be placed in Baggensstäket as well. The station was placed at the narrowest point of the strait and is named Knapens hål ("Knaap's hole") after one of the first customs officials, Olof Knaap. In 1680 the toll inspection was moved from Baggenstäket and Vaxholm to Blockhusudden.

Architect Nicodemus Tessin the Younger, owner of nearby Boo gård, offered to deepen Baggensstäket to a depth of eight Swedish feet, in return for the privilege to collect a "boom fee"; this was collected from ships which couldn't pass a boom barrier placed in the water at a certain depth. He received this privilege in 1704. The clearing of the strait was done with "90 prisoners, over 40 dalecarlians, 12 timbermen, 24 horses and drivers". In April 1705 the work was completed, even if Tessin didn't manage to make the waterway as deep as he had promised.

It was through Baggensstäket the plague came to Sweden in 1710. A boat from Pernau in Estonia had the contagion onboard and when the skipper died at the Erstavik inn at Baggensstäket, the plague gained a foothold in the country.

In 1719 a Russian invasion fleet attempted to reach Stockholm through Baggensstäket, but were beaten back by Swedish forces at this last line of defence (see Battle of Stäket). Shortly thereafter three new redoubts were built on both sides of the strait. After the treaty of Nystad in 1721 these defensive works started decaying; in 1742-1743 temporary fortifications had to be erected.

The 19th and early 20th centuries saw several proposals of widening and deepening the waterway being laid forth, in order to reopen a convenient route for Stockholm-bound sea traffic from the south. None were accepted, one reason being that this would require further expenditures for new fortifications. An alternative was proposed in 1893: a canal south of Baggenstäket at the bay of Moranviken, a distance of less than a kilometer.

Between 1853 and 1947 Gustavsbergsbolaget had the responsibility for maintaining the waterway. The company financed its traffic and the maintenance by among other things extracting a fee from deep-going vessels at Knapens hål. For this purpose a guard booth was built around 1870. There the guard would collect the fee with a håv until 1945, when the last guard retired. Sjöfartsverket took over the responsibility in 1947. In the autumn of 1985 Knapens hål was dredged and widened and new erosion protection was installed.

== See also ==
- Battle of Stäket
- Almarestäket
