= Piano Concerto No. 5 in E-flat major =

Piano Concerto No. 5 in E-flat major may refer to:

- Piano Concerto No. 5 ("Emperor") (Beethoven)
- Piano Concerto No. 5 (Rubinstein)
